

154001–154100 

|-bgcolor=#E9E9E9
| 154001 ||  || — || January 9, 2002 || Haleakala || NEAT || MAR || align=right | 1.9 km || 
|-id=002 bgcolor=#d6d6d6
| 154002 ||  || — || January 12, 2002 || Palomar || NEAT || — || align=right | 4.5 km || 
|-id=003 bgcolor=#E9E9E9
| 154003 ||  || — || January 14, 2002 || Socorro || LINEAR || HEN || align=right | 1.6 km || 
|-id=004 bgcolor=#E9E9E9
| 154004 Haolei ||  ||  || January 13, 2002 || Apache Point || SDSS || — || align=right | 2.5 km || 
|-id=005 bgcolor=#E9E9E9
| 154005 Hughharris ||  ||  || January 13, 2002 || Apache Point || SDSS || MAR || align=right | 1.9 km || 
|-id=006 bgcolor=#E9E9E9
| 154006 Suzannehawley ||  ||  || January 13, 2002 || Apache Point || SDSS || EUN || align=right | 1.7 km || 
|-id=007 bgcolor=#FFC2E0
| 154007 || 2002 BY || — || January 19, 2002 || Socorro || LINEAR || AMO +1km || align=right data-sort-value="0.92" | 920 m || 
|-id=008 bgcolor=#E9E9E9
| 154008 ||  || — || January 18, 2002 || Socorro || LINEAR || — || align=right | 4.7 km || 
|-id=009 bgcolor=#E9E9E9
| 154009 ||  || — || January 19, 2002 || Kitt Peak || Spacewatch || — || align=right | 3.8 km || 
|-id=010 bgcolor=#d6d6d6
| 154010 ||  || — || January 21, 2002 || Socorro || LINEAR || — || align=right | 3.7 km || 
|-id=011 bgcolor=#E9E9E9
| 154011 ||  || — || January 21, 2002 || Socorro || LINEAR || — || align=right | 6.3 km || 
|-id=012 bgcolor=#E9E9E9
| 154012 ||  || — || January 23, 2002 || Socorro || LINEAR || ADE || align=right | 3.7 km || 
|-id=013 bgcolor=#E9E9E9
| 154013 ||  || — || January 23, 2002 || Socorro || LINEAR || EUN || align=right | 2.4 km || 
|-id=014 bgcolor=#E9E9E9
| 154014 ||  || — || January 18, 2002 || Cima Ekar || ADAS || — || align=right | 3.1 km || 
|-id=015 bgcolor=#E9E9E9
| 154015 ||  || — || January 19, 2002 || Anderson Mesa || LONEOS || INO || align=right | 1.6 km || 
|-id=016 bgcolor=#E9E9E9
| 154016 ||  || — || January 20, 2002 || Anderson Mesa || LONEOS || — || align=right | 5.5 km || 
|-id=017 bgcolor=#E9E9E9
| 154017 ||  || — || January 21, 2002 || Palomar || NEAT || — || align=right | 3.6 km || 
|-id=018 bgcolor=#E9E9E9
| 154018 ||  || — || January 23, 2002 || Socorro || LINEAR || — || align=right | 3.9 km || 
|-id=019 bgcolor=#FFC2E0
| 154019 ||  || — || February 6, 2002 || Palomar || NEAT || APOPHAcritical || align=right data-sort-value="0.14" | 140 m || 
|-id=020 bgcolor=#FFC2E0
| 154020 ||  || — || February 6, 2002 || Palomar || NEAT || APO || align=right data-sort-value="0.56" | 560 m || 
|-id=021 bgcolor=#E9E9E9
| 154021 ||  || — || February 6, 2002 || Socorro || LINEAR || — || align=right | 3.5 km || 
|-id=022 bgcolor=#E9E9E9
| 154022 ||  || — || February 6, 2002 || Socorro || LINEAR || — || align=right | 3.9 km || 
|-id=023 bgcolor=#E9E9E9
| 154023 ||  || — || February 6, 2002 || Socorro || LINEAR || — || align=right | 3.9 km || 
|-id=024 bgcolor=#E9E9E9
| 154024 ||  || — || February 6, 2002 || Socorro || LINEAR || — || align=right | 5.3 km || 
|-id=025 bgcolor=#E9E9E9
| 154025 ||  || — || February 7, 2002 || Socorro || LINEAR || — || align=right | 4.1 km || 
|-id=026 bgcolor=#E9E9E9
| 154026 ||  || — || February 7, 2002 || Socorro || LINEAR || — || align=right | 4.2 km || 
|-id=027 bgcolor=#E9E9E9
| 154027 ||  || — || February 12, 2002 || Fountain Hills || C. W. Juels, P. R. Holvorcem || — || align=right | 4.5 km || 
|-id=028 bgcolor=#E9E9E9
| 154028 ||  || — || February 12, 2002 || Fountain Hills || C. W. Juels, P. R. Holvorcem || — || align=right | 4.6 km || 
|-id=029 bgcolor=#FFC2E0
| 154029 ||  || — || February 11, 2002 || Socorro || LINEAR || APO +1km || align=right | 1.1 km || 
|-id=030 bgcolor=#E9E9E9
| 154030 ||  || — || February 3, 2002 || Haleakala || NEAT || — || align=right | 4.0 km || 
|-id=031 bgcolor=#E9E9E9
| 154031 ||  || — || February 3, 2002 || Haleakala || NEAT || — || align=right | 4.1 km || 
|-id=032 bgcolor=#E9E9E9
| 154032 ||  || — || February 7, 2002 || Socorro || LINEAR || — || align=right | 3.4 km || 
|-id=033 bgcolor=#E9E9E9
| 154033 ||  || — || February 7, 2002 || Socorro || LINEAR || — || align=right | 4.1 km || 
|-id=034 bgcolor=#E9E9E9
| 154034 ||  || — || February 7, 2002 || Kitt Peak || Spacewatch || — || align=right | 3.4 km || 
|-id=035 bgcolor=#FFC2E0
| 154035 ||  || — || February 12, 2002 || Kitt Peak || Spacewatch || APO +1km || align=right | 1.1 km || 
|-id=036 bgcolor=#E9E9E9
| 154036 ||  || — || February 7, 2002 || Socorro || LINEAR || — || align=right | 3.3 km || 
|-id=037 bgcolor=#E9E9E9
| 154037 ||  || — || February 7, 2002 || Socorro || LINEAR || — || align=right | 2.2 km || 
|-id=038 bgcolor=#d6d6d6
| 154038 ||  || — || February 7, 2002 || Socorro || LINEAR || KOR || align=right | 1.7 km || 
|-id=039 bgcolor=#d6d6d6
| 154039 ||  || — || February 7, 2002 || Socorro || LINEAR || KOR || align=right | 2.7 km || 
|-id=040 bgcolor=#E9E9E9
| 154040 ||  || — || February 7, 2002 || Socorro || LINEAR || NEM || align=right | 3.0 km || 
|-id=041 bgcolor=#E9E9E9
| 154041 ||  || — || February 7, 2002 || Socorro || LINEAR || AGN || align=right | 2.1 km || 
|-id=042 bgcolor=#E9E9E9
| 154042 ||  || — || February 7, 2002 || Socorro || LINEAR || AGN || align=right | 2.3 km || 
|-id=043 bgcolor=#d6d6d6
| 154043 ||  || — || February 7, 2002 || Socorro || LINEAR || — || align=right | 3.2 km || 
|-id=044 bgcolor=#E9E9E9
| 154044 ||  || — || February 7, 2002 || Socorro || LINEAR || — || align=right | 3.8 km || 
|-id=045 bgcolor=#E9E9E9
| 154045 ||  || — || February 7, 2002 || Socorro || LINEAR || — || align=right | 4.0 km || 
|-id=046 bgcolor=#d6d6d6
| 154046 ||  || — || February 7, 2002 || Socorro || LINEAR || KAR || align=right | 2.3 km || 
|-id=047 bgcolor=#d6d6d6
| 154047 ||  || — || February 13, 2002 || Desert Eagle || W. K. Y. Yeung || — || align=right | 3.9 km || 
|-id=048 bgcolor=#E9E9E9
| 154048 ||  || — || February 7, 2002 || Socorro || LINEAR || GEF || align=right | 2.4 km || 
|-id=049 bgcolor=#E9E9E9
| 154049 ||  || — || February 7, 2002 || Socorro || LINEAR || — || align=right | 4.8 km || 
|-id=050 bgcolor=#fefefe
| 154050 ||  || — || February 7, 2002 || Socorro || LINEAR || NYS || align=right data-sort-value="0.90" | 900 m || 
|-id=051 bgcolor=#E9E9E9
| 154051 ||  || — || February 7, 2002 || Socorro || LINEAR || — || align=right | 4.5 km || 
|-id=052 bgcolor=#E9E9E9
| 154052 ||  || — || February 7, 2002 || Socorro || LINEAR || — || align=right | 2.7 km || 
|-id=053 bgcolor=#E9E9E9
| 154053 ||  || — || February 7, 2002 || Socorro || LINEAR || GEF || align=right | 1.9 km || 
|-id=054 bgcolor=#d6d6d6
| 154054 ||  || — || February 10, 2002 || Socorro || LINEAR || — || align=right | 4.1 km || 
|-id=055 bgcolor=#d6d6d6
| 154055 ||  || — || February 10, 2002 || Socorro || LINEAR || — || align=right | 3.2 km || 
|-id=056 bgcolor=#E9E9E9
| 154056 ||  || — || February 8, 2002 || Socorro || LINEAR || — || align=right | 1.5 km || 
|-id=057 bgcolor=#E9E9E9
| 154057 ||  || — || February 8, 2002 || Socorro || LINEAR || — || align=right | 3.4 km || 
|-id=058 bgcolor=#E9E9E9
| 154058 ||  || — || February 8, 2002 || Socorro || LINEAR || — || align=right | 2.9 km || 
|-id=059 bgcolor=#d6d6d6
| 154059 ||  || — || February 8, 2002 || Socorro || LINEAR || — || align=right | 4.8 km || 
|-id=060 bgcolor=#E9E9E9
| 154060 ||  || — || February 8, 2002 || Socorro || LINEAR || HNA || align=right | 4.1 km || 
|-id=061 bgcolor=#E9E9E9
| 154061 ||  || — || February 10, 2002 || Socorro || LINEAR || — || align=right | 2.4 km || 
|-id=062 bgcolor=#E9E9E9
| 154062 ||  || — || February 10, 2002 || Socorro || LINEAR || — || align=right | 4.1 km || 
|-id=063 bgcolor=#E9E9E9
| 154063 ||  || — || February 10, 2002 || Socorro || LINEAR || — || align=right | 3.5 km || 
|-id=064 bgcolor=#d6d6d6
| 154064 ||  || — || February 10, 2002 || Socorro || LINEAR || KOR || align=right | 1.8 km || 
|-id=065 bgcolor=#d6d6d6
| 154065 ||  || — || February 10, 2002 || Socorro || LINEAR || — || align=right | 4.0 km || 
|-id=066 bgcolor=#E9E9E9
| 154066 ||  || — || February 10, 2002 || Socorro || LINEAR || AST || align=right | 4.0 km || 
|-id=067 bgcolor=#E9E9E9
| 154067 ||  || — || February 10, 2002 || Socorro || LINEAR || — || align=right | 3.2 km || 
|-id=068 bgcolor=#E9E9E9
| 154068 ||  || — || February 10, 2002 || Socorro || LINEAR || — || align=right | 4.0 km || 
|-id=069 bgcolor=#E9E9E9
| 154069 ||  || — || February 10, 2002 || Socorro || LINEAR || AGN || align=right | 1.9 km || 
|-id=070 bgcolor=#E9E9E9
| 154070 ||  || — || February 10, 2002 || Socorro || LINEAR || — || align=right | 4.2 km || 
|-id=071 bgcolor=#E9E9E9
| 154071 ||  || — || February 10, 2002 || Socorro || LINEAR || WIT || align=right | 1.7 km || 
|-id=072 bgcolor=#d6d6d6
| 154072 ||  || — || February 10, 2002 || Socorro || LINEAR || — || align=right | 2.8 km || 
|-id=073 bgcolor=#d6d6d6
| 154073 ||  || — || February 10, 2002 || Socorro || LINEAR || — || align=right | 5.7 km || 
|-id=074 bgcolor=#d6d6d6
| 154074 ||  || — || February 10, 2002 || Socorro || LINEAR || KOR || align=right | 2.3 km || 
|-id=075 bgcolor=#d6d6d6
| 154075 ||  || — || February 10, 2002 || Socorro || LINEAR || KOR || align=right | 2.3 km || 
|-id=076 bgcolor=#E9E9E9
| 154076 ||  || — || February 11, 2002 || Socorro || LINEAR || PAD || align=right | 2.7 km || 
|-id=077 bgcolor=#E9E9E9
| 154077 ||  || — || February 11, 2002 || Socorro || LINEAR || — || align=right | 3.8 km || 
|-id=078 bgcolor=#E9E9E9
| 154078 ||  || — || February 11, 2002 || Socorro || LINEAR || HNA || align=right | 3.6 km || 
|-id=079 bgcolor=#d6d6d6
| 154079 ||  || — || February 11, 2002 || Socorro || LINEAR || — || align=right | 3.3 km || 
|-id=080 bgcolor=#E9E9E9
| 154080 ||  || — || February 7, 2002 || Palomar || NEAT || EUN || align=right | 2.3 km || 
|-id=081 bgcolor=#E9E9E9
| 154081 ||  || — || February 3, 2002 || Haleakala || NEAT || — || align=right | 2.1 km || 
|-id=082 bgcolor=#E9E9E9
| 154082 ||  || — || February 6, 2002 || Palomar || NEAT || EUN || align=right | 2.5 km || 
|-id=083 bgcolor=#E9E9E9
| 154083 ||  || — || February 6, 2002 || Palomar || NEAT || — || align=right | 4.3 km || 
|-id=084 bgcolor=#E9E9E9
| 154084 ||  || — || February 11, 2002 || Socorro || LINEAR || — || align=right | 2.5 km || 
|-id=085 bgcolor=#d6d6d6
| 154085 ||  || — || February 10, 2002 || Socorro || LINEAR || — || align=right | 4.6 km || 
|-id=086 bgcolor=#d6d6d6
| 154086 ||  || — || February 10, 2002 || Socorro || LINEAR || EOS || align=right | 3.4 km || 
|-id=087 bgcolor=#d6d6d6
| 154087 ||  || — || February 11, 2002 || Socorro || LINEAR || — || align=right | 3.9 km || 
|-id=088 bgcolor=#E9E9E9
| 154088 ||  || — || February 15, 2002 || Socorro || LINEAR || PAE || align=right | 5.8 km || 
|-id=089 bgcolor=#E9E9E9
| 154089 ||  || — || February 7, 2002 || Socorro || LINEAR || — || align=right | 5.0 km || 
|-id=090 bgcolor=#E9E9E9
| 154090 ||  || — || February 9, 2002 || Kitt Peak || Spacewatch || HEN || align=right | 1.9 km || 
|-id=091 bgcolor=#d6d6d6
| 154091 ||  || — || February 10, 2002 || Socorro || LINEAR || — || align=right | 3.3 km || 
|-id=092 bgcolor=#E9E9E9
| 154092 ||  || — || February 10, 2002 || Kitt Peak || Spacewatch || HEN || align=right | 2.0 km || 
|-id=093 bgcolor=#E9E9E9
| 154093 ||  || — || February 10, 2002 || Kitt Peak || Spacewatch || — || align=right | 4.1 km || 
|-id=094 bgcolor=#d6d6d6
| 154094 ||  || — || February 12, 2002 || Kitt Peak || Spacewatch || HYG || align=right | 4.1 km || 
|-id=095 bgcolor=#d6d6d6
| 154095 ||  || — || February 10, 2002 || Socorro || LINEAR || — || align=right | 2.6 km || 
|-id=096 bgcolor=#d6d6d6
| 154096 || 2002 DE || — || February 16, 2002 || Ondřejov || P. Kušnirák, P. Pravec || — || align=right | 3.3 km || 
|-id=097 bgcolor=#d6d6d6
| 154097 ||  || — || February 20, 2002 || Kitt Peak || Spacewatch || KAR || align=right | 1.5 km || 
|-id=098 bgcolor=#E9E9E9
| 154098 ||  || — || February 16, 2002 || Palomar || NEAT || AGN || align=right | 1.9 km || 
|-id=099 bgcolor=#E9E9E9
| 154099 ||  || — || February 20, 2002 || Socorro || LINEAR || HOF || align=right | 4.3 km || 
|-id=100 bgcolor=#d6d6d6
| 154100 ||  || — || February 20, 2002 || Socorro || LINEAR || KOR || align=right | 1.9 km || 
|}

154101–154200 

|-bgcolor=#d6d6d6
| 154101 ||  || — || February 20, 2002 || Kitt Peak || Spacewatch || EOS || align=right | 2.8 km || 
|-id=102 bgcolor=#d6d6d6
| 154102 ||  || — || February 20, 2002 || Socorro || LINEAR || — || align=right | 4.1 km || 
|-id=103 bgcolor=#d6d6d6
| 154103 ||  || — || March 10, 2002 || Cima Ekar || ADAS || — || align=right | 3.8 km || 
|-id=104 bgcolor=#d6d6d6
| 154104 ||  || — || March 10, 2002 || Cima Ekar || ADAS || KAR || align=right | 1.7 km || 
|-id=105 bgcolor=#d6d6d6
| 154105 ||  || — || March 10, 2002 || Cima Ekar || ADAS || — || align=right | 3.7 km || 
|-id=106 bgcolor=#E9E9E9
| 154106 ||  || — || March 7, 2002 || Cima Ekar || ADAS || AST || align=right | 4.1 km || 
|-id=107 bgcolor=#d6d6d6
| 154107 ||  || — || March 15, 2002 || Kvistaberg || UDAS || EOS || align=right | 3.7 km || 
|-id=108 bgcolor=#d6d6d6
| 154108 ||  || — || March 6, 2002 || Palomar || NEAT || TRP || align=right | 6.1 km || 
|-id=109 bgcolor=#d6d6d6
| 154109 ||  || — || March 5, 2002 || Kitt Peak || Spacewatch || KOR || align=right | 2.0 km || 
|-id=110 bgcolor=#d6d6d6
| 154110 ||  || — || March 5, 2002 || Kitt Peak || Spacewatch || — || align=right | 3.0 km || 
|-id=111 bgcolor=#d6d6d6
| 154111 ||  || — || March 9, 2002 || Socorro || LINEAR || — || align=right | 4.7 km || 
|-id=112 bgcolor=#d6d6d6
| 154112 ||  || — || March 11, 2002 || Palomar || NEAT || — || align=right | 3.3 km || 
|-id=113 bgcolor=#d6d6d6
| 154113 ||  || — || March 11, 2002 || Palomar || NEAT || — || align=right | 5.5 km || 
|-id=114 bgcolor=#d6d6d6
| 154114 ||  || — || March 9, 2002 || Socorro || LINEAR || KAR || align=right | 2.0 km || 
|-id=115 bgcolor=#d6d6d6
| 154115 ||  || — || March 9, 2002 || Socorro || LINEAR || — || align=right | 4.1 km || 
|-id=116 bgcolor=#d6d6d6
| 154116 ||  || — || March 13, 2002 || Socorro || LINEAR || — || align=right | 3.8 km || 
|-id=117 bgcolor=#E9E9E9
| 154117 ||  || — || March 13, 2002 || Socorro || LINEAR || HOF || align=right | 4.8 km || 
|-id=118 bgcolor=#d6d6d6
| 154118 ||  || — || March 13, 2002 || Socorro || LINEAR || — || align=right | 4.1 km || 
|-id=119 bgcolor=#d6d6d6
| 154119 ||  || — || March 13, 2002 || Socorro || LINEAR || TRE || align=right | 4.0 km || 
|-id=120 bgcolor=#d6d6d6
| 154120 ||  || — || March 13, 2002 || Socorro || LINEAR || KOR || align=right | 2.3 km || 
|-id=121 bgcolor=#d6d6d6
| 154121 ||  || — || March 13, 2002 || Socorro || LINEAR || — || align=right | 5.7 km || 
|-id=122 bgcolor=#d6d6d6
| 154122 ||  || — || March 11, 2002 || Kitt Peak || Spacewatch || KOR || align=right | 2.2 km || 
|-id=123 bgcolor=#d6d6d6
| 154123 ||  || — || March 13, 2002 || Palomar || NEAT || URS || align=right | 5.2 km || 
|-id=124 bgcolor=#E9E9E9
| 154124 ||  || — || March 13, 2002 || Palomar || NEAT || AGN || align=right | 2.0 km || 
|-id=125 bgcolor=#d6d6d6
| 154125 ||  || — || March 13, 2002 || Palomar || NEAT || — || align=right | 3.1 km || 
|-id=126 bgcolor=#d6d6d6
| 154126 ||  || — || March 9, 2002 || Socorro || LINEAR || — || align=right | 4.0 km || 
|-id=127 bgcolor=#d6d6d6
| 154127 ||  || — || March 9, 2002 || Socorro || LINEAR || HYG || align=right | 5.0 km || 
|-id=128 bgcolor=#d6d6d6
| 154128 ||  || — || March 12, 2002 || Socorro || LINEAR || CHA || align=right | 3.8 km || 
|-id=129 bgcolor=#E9E9E9
| 154129 ||  || — || March 14, 2002 || Socorro || LINEAR || AGN || align=right | 2.2 km || 
|-id=130 bgcolor=#E9E9E9
| 154130 ||  || — || March 12, 2002 || Socorro || LINEAR || GEF || align=right | 2.5 km || 
|-id=131 bgcolor=#d6d6d6
| 154131 ||  || — || March 6, 2002 || Catalina || CSS || — || align=right | 4.7 km || 
|-id=132 bgcolor=#d6d6d6
| 154132 ||  || — || March 9, 2002 || Anderson Mesa || LONEOS || — || align=right | 4.1 km || 
|-id=133 bgcolor=#E9E9E9
| 154133 ||  || — || March 9, 2002 || Anderson Mesa || LONEOS || — || align=right | 5.5 km || 
|-id=134 bgcolor=#d6d6d6
| 154134 ||  || — || March 9, 2002 || Catalina || CSS || LIX || align=right | 7.8 km || 
|-id=135 bgcolor=#d6d6d6
| 154135 ||  || — || March 10, 2002 || Kitt Peak || Spacewatch || KOR || align=right | 2.8 km || 
|-id=136 bgcolor=#E9E9E9
| 154136 ||  || — || March 12, 2002 || Kitt Peak || Spacewatch || — || align=right | 2.9 km || 
|-id=137 bgcolor=#d6d6d6
| 154137 ||  || — || March 12, 2002 || Anderson Mesa || LONEOS || HYG || align=right | 5.0 km || 
|-id=138 bgcolor=#d6d6d6
| 154138 ||  || — || March 12, 2002 || Anderson Mesa || LONEOS || HYG || align=right | 4.9 km || 
|-id=139 bgcolor=#d6d6d6
| 154139 ||  || — || March 12, 2002 || Palomar || NEAT || KOR || align=right | 2.8 km || 
|-id=140 bgcolor=#d6d6d6
| 154140 ||  || — || March 15, 2002 || Palomar || NEAT || TEL || align=right | 2.2 km || 
|-id=141 bgcolor=#d6d6d6
| 154141 Kertész ||  ||  || March 12, 2002 || Palomar || K. Sárneczky || — || align=right | 3.3 km || 
|-id=142 bgcolor=#d6d6d6
| 154142 || 2002 FW || — || March 18, 2002 || Desert Eagle || W. K. Y. Yeung || — || align=right | 4.4 km || 
|-id=143 bgcolor=#d6d6d6
| 154143 ||  || — || March 19, 2002 || Desert Eagle || W. K. Y. Yeung || — || align=right | 6.5 km || 
|-id=144 bgcolor=#FFC2E0
| 154144 ||  || — || March 20, 2002 || Socorro || LINEAR || AMO +1km || align=right | 1.2 km || 
|-id=145 bgcolor=#d6d6d6
| 154145 ||  || — || March 22, 2002 || Eskridge || Farpoint Obs. || — || align=right | 5.0 km || 
|-id=146 bgcolor=#d6d6d6
| 154146 ||  || — || March 16, 2002 || Haleakala || NEAT || EOS || align=right | 3.1 km || 
|-id=147 bgcolor=#d6d6d6
| 154147 ||  || — || March 20, 2002 || Kitt Peak || Spacewatch || HYG || align=right | 4.9 km || 
|-id=148 bgcolor=#E9E9E9
| 154148 ||  || — || March 30, 2002 || Palomar || NEAT || — || align=right | 3.9 km || 
|-id=149 bgcolor=#d6d6d6
| 154149 ||  || — || April 5, 2002 || Eskridge || Farpoint Obs. || — || align=right | 8.5 km || 
|-id=150 bgcolor=#d6d6d6
| 154150 ||  || — || April 8, 2002 || Palomar || NEAT || EUP || align=right | 5.3 km || 
|-id=151 bgcolor=#d6d6d6
| 154151 ||  || — || April 8, 2002 || Palomar || NEAT || THB || align=right | 4.4 km || 
|-id=152 bgcolor=#d6d6d6
| 154152 ||  || — || April 4, 2002 || Palomar || NEAT || EUP || align=right | 8.4 km || 
|-id=153 bgcolor=#fefefe
| 154153 ||  || — || April 10, 2002 || Socorro || LINEAR || H || align=right | 1.2 km || 
|-id=154 bgcolor=#FA8072
| 154154 ||  || — || April 10, 2002 || Socorro || LINEAR || H || align=right data-sort-value="0.96" | 960 m || 
|-id=155 bgcolor=#d6d6d6
| 154155 ||  || — || April 14, 2002 || Desert Eagle || W. K. Y. Yeung || — || align=right | 7.6 km || 
|-id=156 bgcolor=#d6d6d6
| 154156 ||  || — || April 14, 2002 || Socorro || LINEAR || EMA || align=right | 5.9 km || 
|-id=157 bgcolor=#d6d6d6
| 154157 ||  || — || April 14, 2002 || Socorro || LINEAR || — || align=right | 5.0 km || 
|-id=158 bgcolor=#d6d6d6
| 154158 ||  || — || April 2, 2002 || Kitt Peak || Spacewatch || KOR || align=right | 2.3 km || 
|-id=159 bgcolor=#d6d6d6
| 154159 ||  || — || April 3, 2002 || Palomar || NEAT || EOS || align=right | 4.0 km || 
|-id=160 bgcolor=#d6d6d6
| 154160 ||  || — || April 2, 2002 || Palomar || NEAT || 628 || align=right | 3.7 km || 
|-id=161 bgcolor=#d6d6d6
| 154161 ||  || — || April 4, 2002 || Palomar || NEAT || KOR || align=right | 1.9 km || 
|-id=162 bgcolor=#d6d6d6
| 154162 ||  || — || April 5, 2002 || Palomar || NEAT || LIX || align=right | 6.1 km || 
|-id=163 bgcolor=#d6d6d6
| 154163 ||  || — || April 8, 2002 || Palomar || NEAT || — || align=right | 5.2 km || 
|-id=164 bgcolor=#d6d6d6
| 154164 ||  || — || April 8, 2002 || Palomar || NEAT || — || align=right | 4.4 km || 
|-id=165 bgcolor=#d6d6d6
| 154165 ||  || — || April 8, 2002 || Palomar || NEAT || KOR || align=right | 2.9 km || 
|-id=166 bgcolor=#d6d6d6
| 154166 ||  || — || April 8, 2002 || Palomar || NEAT || — || align=right | 4.5 km || 
|-id=167 bgcolor=#d6d6d6
| 154167 ||  || — || April 8, 2002 || Palomar || NEAT || — || align=right | 4.9 km || 
|-id=168 bgcolor=#d6d6d6
| 154168 ||  || — || April 8, 2002 || Palomar || NEAT || — || align=right | 4.2 km || 
|-id=169 bgcolor=#d6d6d6
| 154169 ||  || — || April 8, 2002 || Kitt Peak || Spacewatch || — || align=right | 3.6 km || 
|-id=170 bgcolor=#d6d6d6
| 154170 ||  || — || April 8, 2002 || Socorro || LINEAR || TIR || align=right | 6.1 km || 
|-id=171 bgcolor=#d6d6d6
| 154171 ||  || — || April 8, 2002 || Socorro || LINEAR || EOS || align=right | 3.7 km || 
|-id=172 bgcolor=#d6d6d6
| 154172 ||  || — || April 9, 2002 || Palomar || NEAT || — || align=right | 4.9 km || 
|-id=173 bgcolor=#d6d6d6
| 154173 ||  || — || April 9, 2002 || Socorro || LINEAR || — || align=right | 5.1 km || 
|-id=174 bgcolor=#d6d6d6
| 154174 ||  || — || April 10, 2002 || Socorro || LINEAR || EOS || align=right | 3.3 km || 
|-id=175 bgcolor=#d6d6d6
| 154175 ||  || — || April 10, 2002 || Socorro || LINEAR || EOS || align=right | 3.6 km || 
|-id=176 bgcolor=#d6d6d6
| 154176 ||  || — || April 10, 2002 || Socorro || LINEAR || TIR || align=right | 4.8 km || 
|-id=177 bgcolor=#d6d6d6
| 154177 ||  || — || April 11, 2002 || Anderson Mesa || LONEOS || EUP || align=right | 6.2 km || 
|-id=178 bgcolor=#d6d6d6
| 154178 ||  || — || April 11, 2002 || Anderson Mesa || LONEOS || EOS || align=right | 3.5 km || 
|-id=179 bgcolor=#d6d6d6
| 154179 ||  || — || April 11, 2002 || Anderson Mesa || LONEOS || — || align=right | 5.2 km || 
|-id=180 bgcolor=#d6d6d6
| 154180 ||  || — || April 11, 2002 || Palomar || NEAT || — || align=right | 6.2 km || 
|-id=181 bgcolor=#d6d6d6
| 154181 ||  || — || April 11, 2002 || Socorro || LINEAR || — || align=right | 7.0 km || 
|-id=182 bgcolor=#d6d6d6
| 154182 ||  || — || April 11, 2002 || Socorro || LINEAR || — || align=right | 5.1 km || 
|-id=183 bgcolor=#d6d6d6
| 154183 ||  || — || April 11, 2002 || Socorro || LINEAR || — || align=right | 4.9 km || 
|-id=184 bgcolor=#d6d6d6
| 154184 ||  || — || April 11, 2002 || Socorro || LINEAR || — || align=right | 5.1 km || 
|-id=185 bgcolor=#d6d6d6
| 154185 ||  || — || April 10, 2002 || Palomar || NEAT || — || align=right | 5.7 km || 
|-id=186 bgcolor=#d6d6d6
| 154186 ||  || — || April 10, 2002 || Socorro || LINEAR || — || align=right | 6.3 km || 
|-id=187 bgcolor=#d6d6d6
| 154187 ||  || — || April 10, 2002 || Socorro || LINEAR || — || align=right | 4.0 km || 
|-id=188 bgcolor=#d6d6d6
| 154188 ||  || — || April 10, 2002 || Palomar || NEAT || CHA || align=right | 2.6 km || 
|-id=189 bgcolor=#E9E9E9
| 154189 ||  || — || April 12, 2002 || Socorro || LINEAR || — || align=right | 3.6 km || 
|-id=190 bgcolor=#d6d6d6
| 154190 ||  || — || April 12, 2002 || Socorro || LINEAR || — || align=right | 4.0 km || 
|-id=191 bgcolor=#d6d6d6
| 154191 ||  || — || April 12, 2002 || Socorro || LINEAR || — || align=right | 3.3 km || 
|-id=192 bgcolor=#d6d6d6
| 154192 ||  || — || April 13, 2002 || Palomar || NEAT || — || align=right | 4.1 km || 
|-id=193 bgcolor=#d6d6d6
| 154193 ||  || — || April 12, 2002 || Palomar || NEAT || — || align=right | 5.6 km || 
|-id=194 bgcolor=#d6d6d6
| 154194 ||  || — || April 12, 2002 || Palomar || NEAT || EOS || align=right | 3.5 km || 
|-id=195 bgcolor=#d6d6d6
| 154195 ||  || — || April 13, 2002 || Palomar || NEAT || EOS || align=right | 3.2 km || 
|-id=196 bgcolor=#d6d6d6
| 154196 ||  || — || April 12, 2002 || Palomar || NEAT || EOS || align=right | 3.0 km || 
|-id=197 bgcolor=#d6d6d6
| 154197 ||  || — || April 12, 2002 || Palomar || NEAT || — || align=right | 5.4 km || 
|-id=198 bgcolor=#d6d6d6
| 154198 ||  || — || April 14, 2002 || Palomar || NEAT || EOS || align=right | 3.6 km || 
|-id=199 bgcolor=#d6d6d6
| 154199 ||  || — || April 14, 2002 || Palomar || NEAT || — || align=right | 2.7 km || 
|-id=200 bgcolor=#d6d6d6
| 154200 ||  || — || April 9, 2002 || Socorro || LINEAR || — || align=right | 5.0 km || 
|}

154201–154300 

|-bgcolor=#d6d6d6
| 154201 ||  || — || April 10, 2002 || Socorro || LINEAR || — || align=right | 5.1 km || 
|-id=202 bgcolor=#d6d6d6
| 154202 ||  || — || April 16, 2002 || Socorro || LINEAR || — || align=right | 6.4 km || 
|-id=203 bgcolor=#d6d6d6
| 154203 ||  || — || April 18, 2002 || Desert Eagle || W. K. Y. Yeung || — || align=right | 4.5 km || 
|-id=204 bgcolor=#d6d6d6
| 154204 ||  || — || April 18, 2002 || Socorro || LINEAR || — || align=right | 7.8 km || 
|-id=205 bgcolor=#fefefe
| 154205 ||  || — || April 21, 2002 || Socorro || LINEAR || H || align=right | 1.2 km || 
|-id=206 bgcolor=#d6d6d6
| 154206 ||  || — || April 18, 2002 || Kitt Peak || Spacewatch || THM || align=right | 2.9 km || 
|-id=207 bgcolor=#d6d6d6
| 154207 ||  || — || May 5, 2002 || Desert Eagle || W. K. Y. Yeung || — || align=right | 5.7 km || 
|-id=208 bgcolor=#d6d6d6
| 154208 ||  || — || May 9, 2002 || Desert Eagle || W. K. Y. Yeung || ALA || align=right | 6.3 km || 
|-id=209 bgcolor=#d6d6d6
| 154209 ||  || — || May 8, 2002 || Socorro || LINEAR || — || align=right | 5.8 km || 
|-id=210 bgcolor=#d6d6d6
| 154210 ||  || — || May 9, 2002 || Socorro || LINEAR || — || align=right | 5.5 km || 
|-id=211 bgcolor=#d6d6d6
| 154211 ||  || — || May 9, 2002 || Anderson Mesa || LONEOS || — || align=right | 6.8 km || 
|-id=212 bgcolor=#d6d6d6
| 154212 ||  || — || May 8, 2002 || Haleakala || NEAT || — || align=right | 5.9 km || 
|-id=213 bgcolor=#d6d6d6
| 154213 ||  || — || May 10, 2002 || Desert Eagle || W. K. Y. Yeung || TIR || align=right | 4.6 km || 
|-id=214 bgcolor=#d6d6d6
| 154214 ||  || — || May 10, 2002 || Desert Eagle || W. K. Y. Yeung || — || align=right | 5.8 km || 
|-id=215 bgcolor=#d6d6d6
| 154215 ||  || — || May 8, 2002 || Socorro || LINEAR || URS || align=right | 6.0 km || 
|-id=216 bgcolor=#d6d6d6
| 154216 ||  || — || May 9, 2002 || Socorro || LINEAR || EUP || align=right | 7.6 km || 
|-id=217 bgcolor=#d6d6d6
| 154217 ||  || — || May 10, 2002 || Palomar || NEAT || EOS || align=right | 4.3 km || 
|-id=218 bgcolor=#d6d6d6
| 154218 ||  || — || May 8, 2002 || Socorro || LINEAR || — || align=right | 6.8 km || 
|-id=219 bgcolor=#d6d6d6
| 154219 ||  || — || May 8, 2002 || Socorro || LINEAR || — || align=right | 5.4 km || 
|-id=220 bgcolor=#d6d6d6
| 154220 ||  || — || May 9, 2002 || Socorro || LINEAR || EOS || align=right | 3.8 km || 
|-id=221 bgcolor=#d6d6d6
| 154221 ||  || — || May 9, 2002 || Socorro || LINEAR || — || align=right | 6.1 km || 
|-id=222 bgcolor=#d6d6d6
| 154222 ||  || — || May 8, 2002 || Socorro || LINEAR || — || align=right | 6.9 km || 
|-id=223 bgcolor=#d6d6d6
| 154223 ||  || — || May 11, 2002 || Socorro || LINEAR || — || align=right | 5.7 km || 
|-id=224 bgcolor=#d6d6d6
| 154224 ||  || — || May 11, 2002 || Socorro || LINEAR || — || align=right | 5.4 km || 
|-id=225 bgcolor=#d6d6d6
| 154225 ||  || — || May 11, 2002 || Socorro || LINEAR || — || align=right | 5.3 km || 
|-id=226 bgcolor=#d6d6d6
| 154226 ||  || — || May 11, 2002 || Socorro || LINEAR || — || align=right | 5.8 km || 
|-id=227 bgcolor=#d6d6d6
| 154227 ||  || — || May 11, 2002 || Socorro || LINEAR || HYG || align=right | 4.6 km || 
|-id=228 bgcolor=#d6d6d6
| 154228 ||  || — || May 11, 2002 || Socorro || LINEAR || — || align=right | 6.0 km || 
|-id=229 bgcolor=#FFC2E0
| 154229 ||  || — || May 13, 2002 || Socorro || LINEAR || APO +1km || align=right | 1.6 km || 
|-id=230 bgcolor=#d6d6d6
| 154230 ||  || — || May 11, 2002 || Socorro || LINEAR || VER || align=right | 5.1 km || 
|-id=231 bgcolor=#d6d6d6
| 154231 ||  || — || May 10, 2002 || Socorro || LINEAR || — || align=right | 4.4 km || 
|-id=232 bgcolor=#d6d6d6
| 154232 ||  || — || May 10, 2002 || Socorro || LINEAR || — || align=right | 6.4 km || 
|-id=233 bgcolor=#d6d6d6
| 154233 ||  || — || May 11, 2002 || Socorro || LINEAR || — || align=right | 4.3 km || 
|-id=234 bgcolor=#d6d6d6
| 154234 ||  || — || May 11, 2002 || Socorro || LINEAR || — || align=right | 6.2 km || 
|-id=235 bgcolor=#d6d6d6
| 154235 ||  || — || May 5, 2002 || Palomar || NEAT || — || align=right | 5.4 km || 
|-id=236 bgcolor=#d6d6d6
| 154236 ||  || — || May 6, 2002 || Socorro || LINEAR || — || align=right | 5.3 km || 
|-id=237 bgcolor=#d6d6d6
| 154237 ||  || — || May 6, 2002 || Palomar || NEAT || EOS || align=right | 3.6 km || 
|-id=238 bgcolor=#d6d6d6
| 154238 ||  || — || May 6, 2002 || Palomar || NEAT || EOS || align=right | 3.8 km || 
|-id=239 bgcolor=#d6d6d6
| 154239 ||  || — || May 9, 2002 || Socorro || LINEAR || HYG || align=right | 5.4 km || 
|-id=240 bgcolor=#d6d6d6
| 154240 ||  || — || May 10, 2002 || Palomar || NEAT || — || align=right | 5.5 km || 
|-id=241 bgcolor=#d6d6d6
| 154241 ||  || — || May 15, 2002 || Socorro || LINEAR || URS || align=right | 6.2 km || 
|-id=242 bgcolor=#d6d6d6
| 154242 ||  || — || May 18, 2002 || Palomar || NEAT || — || align=right | 3.8 km || 
|-id=243 bgcolor=#d6d6d6
| 154243 ||  || — || May 18, 2002 || Socorro || LINEAR || EOS || align=right | 3.6 km || 
|-id=244 bgcolor=#FFC2E0
| 154244 ||  || — || May 27, 2002 || Haleakala || NEAT || AMO +1km || align=right | 1.1 km || 
|-id=245 bgcolor=#d6d6d6
| 154245 ||  || — || May 29, 2002 || Palomar || NEAT || LUT || align=right | 8.1 km || 
|-id=246 bgcolor=#d6d6d6
| 154246 ||  || — || May 29, 2002 || Palomar || NEAT || — || align=right | 5.4 km || 
|-id=247 bgcolor=#d6d6d6
| 154247 ||  || — || May 29, 2002 || Haleakala || NEAT || — || align=right | 6.4 km || 
|-id=248 bgcolor=#d6d6d6
| 154248 ||  || — || May 16, 2002 || Socorro || LINEAR || — || align=right | 4.9 km || 
|-id=249 bgcolor=#d6d6d6
| 154249 ||  || — || May 17, 2002 || Palomar || NEAT || — || align=right | 5.0 km || 
|-id=250 bgcolor=#d6d6d6
| 154250 ||  || — || May 21, 2002 || Socorro || LINEAR || HYG || align=right | 4.8 km || 
|-id=251 bgcolor=#d6d6d6
| 154251 ||  || — || June 4, 2002 || Palomar || NEAT || JLI || align=right | 7.2 km || 
|-id=252 bgcolor=#d6d6d6
| 154252 ||  || — || June 6, 2002 || Kitt Peak || Spacewatch || — || align=right | 3.7 km || 
|-id=253 bgcolor=#d6d6d6
| 154253 ||  || — || June 10, 2002 || Socorro || LINEAR || — || align=right | 5.3 km || 
|-id=254 bgcolor=#d6d6d6
| 154254 ||  || — || June 10, 2002 || Socorro || LINEAR || — || align=right | 5.1 km || 
|-id=255 bgcolor=#d6d6d6
| 154255 ||  || — || June 5, 2002 || Anderson Mesa || LONEOS || — || align=right | 5.9 km || 
|-id=256 bgcolor=#d6d6d6
| 154256 ||  || — || June 14, 2002 || Socorro || LINEAR || — || align=right | 5.5 km || 
|-id=257 bgcolor=#d6d6d6
| 154257 ||  || — || June 15, 2002 || Socorro || LINEAR || — || align=right | 10 km || 
|-id=258 bgcolor=#fefefe
| 154258 ||  || — || July 5, 2002 || Socorro || LINEAR || H || align=right data-sort-value="0.93" | 930 m || 
|-id=259 bgcolor=#fefefe
| 154259 ||  || — || July 12, 2002 || Palomar || NEAT || ERI || align=right | 2.9 km || 
|-id=260 bgcolor=#fefefe
| 154260 || 2002 PZ || — || August 1, 2002 || Socorro || LINEAR || H || align=right | 1.1 km || 
|-id=261 bgcolor=#fefefe
| 154261 ||  || — || September 4, 2002 || Palomar || NEAT || NYS || align=right data-sort-value="0.97" | 970 m || 
|-id=262 bgcolor=#d6d6d6
| 154262 ||  || — || September 4, 2002 || Anderson Mesa || LONEOS || 3:2 || align=right | 8.9 km || 
|-id=263 bgcolor=#d6d6d6
| 154263 ||  || — || September 5, 2002 || Socorro || LINEAR || 3:2 || align=right | 5.0 km || 
|-id=264 bgcolor=#d6d6d6
| 154264 ||  || — || September 5, 2002 || Socorro || LINEAR || HIL3:2 || align=right | 9.4 km || 
|-id=265 bgcolor=#E9E9E9
| 154265 ||  || — || September 5, 2002 || Socorro || LINEAR || — || align=right | 1.2 km || 
|-id=266 bgcolor=#fefefe
| 154266 ||  || — || September 5, 2002 || Socorro || LINEAR || — || align=right | 1.7 km || 
|-id=267 bgcolor=#E9E9E9
| 154267 ||  || — || September 5, 2002 || Socorro || LINEAR || — || align=right | 6.4 km || 
|-id=268 bgcolor=#FFC2E0
| 154268 ||  || — || September 9, 2002 || Palomar || NEAT || APO +1km || align=right data-sort-value="0.90" | 900 m || 
|-id=269 bgcolor=#FFC2E0
| 154269 || 2002 SM || — || September 16, 2002 || Palomar || NEAT || APO +1kmPHA || align=right data-sort-value="0.99" | 990 m || 
|-id=270 bgcolor=#fefefe
| 154270 ||  || — || September 27, 2002 || Palomar || NEAT || — || align=right | 1.0 km || 
|-id=271 bgcolor=#fefefe
| 154271 ||  || — || September 26, 2002 || Palomar || NEAT || — || align=right | 1.7 km || 
|-id=272 bgcolor=#fefefe
| 154272 ||  || — || September 28, 2002 || Haleakala || NEAT || — || align=right | 1.2 km || 
|-id=273 bgcolor=#fefefe
| 154273 ||  || — || September 29, 2002 || Haleakala || NEAT || — || align=right | 1.3 km || 
|-id=274 bgcolor=#fefefe
| 154274 ||  || — || September 30, 2002 || Socorro || LINEAR || — || align=right | 1.1 km || 
|-id=275 bgcolor=#FFC2E0
| 154275 ||  || — || September 30, 2002 || Socorro || LINEAR || APOPHA || align=right data-sort-value="0.35" | 350 m || 
|-id=276 bgcolor=#FFC2E0
| 154276 ||  || — || September 30, 2002 || Socorro || LINEAR || APO +1kmPHA || align=right | 1.1 km || 
|-id=277 bgcolor=#E9E9E9
| 154277 ||  || — || September 30, 2002 || Socorro || LINEAR || MAR || align=right | 1.4 km || 
|-id=278 bgcolor=#FFC2E0
| 154278 ||  || — || October 2, 2002 || Socorro || LINEAR || APO +1km || align=right | 1.7 km || 
|-id=279 bgcolor=#fefefe
| 154279 ||  || — || October 2, 2002 || Socorro || LINEAR || — || align=right data-sort-value="0.89" | 890 m || 
|-id=280 bgcolor=#fefefe
| 154280 ||  || — || October 2, 2002 || Socorro || LINEAR || FLO || align=right | 1.3 km || 
|-id=281 bgcolor=#fefefe
| 154281 ||  || — || October 2, 2002 || Socorro || LINEAR || — || align=right | 2.9 km || 
|-id=282 bgcolor=#fefefe
| 154282 ||  || — || October 2, 2002 || Socorro || LINEAR || FLO || align=right | 1.3 km || 
|-id=283 bgcolor=#fefefe
| 154283 ||  || — || October 2, 2002 || Socorro || LINEAR || — || align=right | 1.3 km || 
|-id=284 bgcolor=#fefefe
| 154284 ||  || — || October 2, 2002 || Socorro || LINEAR || — || align=right | 1.5 km || 
|-id=285 bgcolor=#fefefe
| 154285 ||  || — || October 2, 2002 || Socorro || LINEAR || — || align=right | 1.3 km || 
|-id=286 bgcolor=#fefefe
| 154286 ||  || — || October 1, 2002 || Haleakala || NEAT || — || align=right | 1.4 km || 
|-id=287 bgcolor=#fefefe
| 154287 ||  || — || October 4, 2002 || Socorro || LINEAR || — || align=right data-sort-value="0.98" | 980 m || 
|-id=288 bgcolor=#fefefe
| 154288 ||  || — || October 3, 2002 || Palomar || NEAT || FLO || align=right data-sort-value="0.93" | 930 m || 
|-id=289 bgcolor=#fefefe
| 154289 ||  || — || October 4, 2002 || Palomar || NEAT || — || align=right | 1.3 km || 
|-id=290 bgcolor=#fefefe
| 154290 ||  || — || October 4, 2002 || Socorro || LINEAR || FLO || align=right | 1.6 km || 
|-id=291 bgcolor=#fefefe
| 154291 ||  || — || October 7, 2002 || Socorro || LINEAR || — || align=right | 1.3 km || 
|-id=292 bgcolor=#fefefe
| 154292 ||  || — || October 9, 2002 || Socorro || LINEAR || — || align=right | 1.0 km || 
|-id=293 bgcolor=#fefefe
| 154293 ||  || — || October 9, 2002 || Socorro || LINEAR || — || align=right | 1.2 km || 
|-id=294 bgcolor=#fefefe
| 154294 ||  || — || October 10, 2002 || Socorro || LINEAR || — || align=right | 1.5 km || 
|-id=295 bgcolor=#fefefe
| 154295 ||  || — || October 10, 2002 || Socorro || LINEAR || V || align=right | 1.2 km || 
|-id=296 bgcolor=#fefefe
| 154296 ||  || — || October 10, 2002 || Socorro || LINEAR || FLO || align=right data-sort-value="0.91" | 910 m || 
|-id=297 bgcolor=#fefefe
| 154297 ||  || — || October 10, 2002 || Socorro || LINEAR || — || align=right | 1.6 km || 
|-id=298 bgcolor=#fefefe
| 154298 ||  || — || October 10, 2002 || Socorro || LINEAR || — || align=right | 1.4 km || 
|-id=299 bgcolor=#fefefe
| 154299 ||  || — || October 11, 2002 || Socorro || LINEAR || — || align=right | 1.1 km || 
|-id=300 bgcolor=#FFC2E0
| 154300 || 2002 UO || — || October 22, 2002 || Palomar || NEAT || APO || align=right data-sort-value="0.50" | 500 m || 
|}

154301–154400 

|-bgcolor=#fefefe
| 154301 ||  || — || October 26, 2002 || Haleakala || NEAT || — || align=right | 1.2 km || 
|-id=302 bgcolor=#FFC2E0
| 154302 ||  || — || October 29, 2002 || Fountain Hills || C. W. Juels, P. R. Holvorcem || APO +1kmPHA || align=right | 1.0 km || 
|-id=303 bgcolor=#E9E9E9
| 154303 ||  || — || October 28, 2002 || Haleakala || NEAT || — || align=right | 2.1 km || 
|-id=304 bgcolor=#fefefe
| 154304 ||  || — || October 30, 2002 || Haleakala || NEAT || FLO || align=right data-sort-value="0.96" | 960 m || 
|-id=305 bgcolor=#E9E9E9
| 154305 ||  || — || October 30, 2002 || Haleakala || NEAT || — || align=right | 2.5 km || 
|-id=306 bgcolor=#fefefe
| 154306 ||  || — || October 30, 2002 || Kvistaberg || UDAS || — || align=right data-sort-value="0.90" | 900 m || 
|-id=307 bgcolor=#E9E9E9
| 154307 ||  || — || October 31, 2002 || Socorro || LINEAR || — || align=right | 2.2 km || 
|-id=308 bgcolor=#fefefe
| 154308 ||  || — || November 2, 2002 || Kitt Peak || Spacewatch || NYS || align=right data-sort-value="0.98" | 980 m || 
|-id=309 bgcolor=#fefefe
| 154309 ||  || — || November 4, 2002 || Palomar || NEAT || — || align=right | 1.4 km || 
|-id=310 bgcolor=#fefefe
| 154310 ||  || — || November 1, 2002 || Palomar || NEAT || — || align=right | 1.1 km || 
|-id=311 bgcolor=#fefefe
| 154311 ||  || — || November 5, 2002 || Socorro || LINEAR || FLO || align=right | 1.1 km || 
|-id=312 bgcolor=#fefefe
| 154312 ||  || — || November 4, 2002 || Palomar || NEAT || — || align=right | 1.3 km || 
|-id=313 bgcolor=#E9E9E9
| 154313 ||  || — || November 4, 2002 || Palomar || NEAT || — || align=right | 1.8 km || 
|-id=314 bgcolor=#fefefe
| 154314 ||  || — || November 4, 2002 || Kitt Peak || Spacewatch || — || align=right data-sort-value="0.98" | 980 m || 
|-id=315 bgcolor=#fefefe
| 154315 ||  || — || November 5, 2002 || Anderson Mesa || LONEOS || — || align=right | 1.3 km || 
|-id=316 bgcolor=#E9E9E9
| 154316 ||  || — || November 5, 2002 || Socorro || LINEAR || — || align=right | 2.1 km || 
|-id=317 bgcolor=#fefefe
| 154317 ||  || — || November 5, 2002 || Socorro || LINEAR || — || align=right | 2.6 km || 
|-id=318 bgcolor=#fefefe
| 154318 ||  || — || November 5, 2002 || Socorro || LINEAR || — || align=right data-sort-value="0.94" | 940 m || 
|-id=319 bgcolor=#fefefe
| 154319 ||  || — || November 5, 2002 || Palomar || NEAT || — || align=right | 1.4 km || 
|-id=320 bgcolor=#fefefe
| 154320 ||  || — || November 5, 2002 || Anderson Mesa || LONEOS || FLO || align=right | 1.0 km || 
|-id=321 bgcolor=#fefefe
| 154321 ||  || — || November 5, 2002 || Socorro || LINEAR || FLO || align=right | 1.7 km || 
|-id=322 bgcolor=#E9E9E9
| 154322 ||  || — || November 5, 2002 || Socorro || LINEAR || — || align=right | 1.5 km || 
|-id=323 bgcolor=#fefefe
| 154323 ||  || — || November 5, 2002 || Socorro || LINEAR || — || align=right | 1.3 km || 
|-id=324 bgcolor=#E9E9E9
| 154324 ||  || — || November 5, 2002 || Socorro || LINEAR || — || align=right | 4.4 km || 
|-id=325 bgcolor=#fefefe
| 154325 ||  || — || November 6, 2002 || Anderson Mesa || LONEOS || FLO || align=right data-sort-value="0.85" | 850 m || 
|-id=326 bgcolor=#fefefe
| 154326 ||  || — || November 6, 2002 || Haleakala || NEAT || NYS || align=right | 1.9 km || 
|-id=327 bgcolor=#fefefe
| 154327 ||  || — || November 7, 2002 || Socorro || LINEAR || — || align=right | 1.2 km || 
|-id=328 bgcolor=#fefefe
| 154328 ||  || — || November 7, 2002 || Socorro || LINEAR || — || align=right | 1.2 km || 
|-id=329 bgcolor=#fefefe
| 154329 ||  || — || November 12, 2002 || Socorro || LINEAR || — || align=right | 1.5 km || 
|-id=330 bgcolor=#FFC2E0
| 154330 ||  || — || November 14, 2002 || Palomar || NEAT || APO +1kmPHA || align=right data-sort-value="0.83" | 830 m || 
|-id=331 bgcolor=#FA8072
| 154331 ||  || — || November 14, 2002 || Socorro || LINEAR || — || align=right data-sort-value="0.95" | 950 m || 
|-id=332 bgcolor=#fefefe
| 154332 ||  || — || November 12, 2002 || Socorro || LINEAR || — || align=right | 1.6 km || 
|-id=333 bgcolor=#fefefe
| 154333 ||  || — || November 12, 2002 || Socorro || LINEAR || — || align=right data-sort-value="0.99" | 990 m || 
|-id=334 bgcolor=#E9E9E9
| 154334 ||  || — || November 11, 2002 || Socorro || LINEAR || — || align=right | 2.1 km || 
|-id=335 bgcolor=#fefefe
| 154335 ||  || — || November 12, 2002 || Socorro || LINEAR || — || align=right | 1.5 km || 
|-id=336 bgcolor=#fefefe
| 154336 ||  || — || November 13, 2002 || Socorro || LINEAR || — || align=right | 1.1 km || 
|-id=337 bgcolor=#E9E9E9
| 154337 ||  || — || November 13, 2002 || Palomar || NEAT || — || align=right | 4.1 km || 
|-id=338 bgcolor=#fefefe
| 154338 ||  || — || November 12, 2002 || Socorro || LINEAR || — || align=right | 1.4 km || 
|-id=339 bgcolor=#fefefe
| 154339 || 2002 WM || — || November 18, 2002 || Palomar || NEAT || PHO || align=right | 2.1 km || 
|-id=340 bgcolor=#fefefe
| 154340 ||  || — || November 23, 2002 || Palomar || NEAT || — || align=right | 1.3 km || 
|-id=341 bgcolor=#fefefe
| 154341 ||  || — || November 23, 2002 || Palomar || NEAT || — || align=right | 1.3 km || 
|-id=342 bgcolor=#fefefe
| 154342 ||  || — || November 24, 2002 || Palomar || NEAT || FLO || align=right | 1.1 km || 
|-id=343 bgcolor=#fefefe
| 154343 ||  || — || November 24, 2002 || Palomar || NEAT || — || align=right | 1.1 km || 
|-id=344 bgcolor=#fefefe
| 154344 ||  || — || November 24, 2002 || Palomar || NEAT || — || align=right | 1.2 km || 
|-id=345 bgcolor=#fefefe
| 154345 ||  || — || November 29, 2002 || Emerald Lane || L. Ball || NYS || align=right | 1.1 km || 
|-id=346 bgcolor=#fefefe
| 154346 || 2002 XP || — || December 1, 2002 || Socorro || LINEAR || FLO || align=right data-sort-value="0.92" | 920 m || 
|-id=347 bgcolor=#FFC2E0
| 154347 ||  || — || December 4, 2002 || Socorro || LINEAR || APO +1km || align=right | 2.3 km || 
|-id=348 bgcolor=#fefefe
| 154348 ||  || — || December 1, 2002 || Haleakala || NEAT || — || align=right | 1.4 km || 
|-id=349 bgcolor=#fefefe
| 154349 ||  || — || December 5, 2002 || Kitt Peak || Spacewatch || FLO || align=right data-sort-value="0.94" | 940 m || 
|-id=350 bgcolor=#fefefe
| 154350 ||  || — || December 5, 2002 || Socorro || LINEAR || NYS || align=right | 2.3 km || 
|-id=351 bgcolor=#fefefe
| 154351 ||  || — || December 5, 2002 || Socorro || LINEAR || — || align=right | 1.1 km || 
|-id=352 bgcolor=#fefefe
| 154352 ||  || — || December 5, 2002 || Socorro || LINEAR || FLO || align=right | 1.0 km || 
|-id=353 bgcolor=#fefefe
| 154353 ||  || — || December 6, 2002 || Socorro || LINEAR || — || align=right | 1.2 km || 
|-id=354 bgcolor=#fefefe
| 154354 ||  || — || December 3, 2002 || Palomar || NEAT || — || align=right | 1.5 km || 
|-id=355 bgcolor=#E9E9E9
| 154355 ||  || — || December 6, 2002 || Socorro || LINEAR || VIB || align=right | 5.1 km || 
|-id=356 bgcolor=#fefefe
| 154356 ||  || — || December 5, 2002 || Socorro || LINEAR || — || align=right data-sort-value="0.98" | 980 m || 
|-id=357 bgcolor=#E9E9E9
| 154357 ||  || — || December 7, 2002 || Socorro || LINEAR || — || align=right | 1.9 km || 
|-id=358 bgcolor=#fefefe
| 154358 ||  || — || December 9, 2002 || Desert Eagle || W. K. Y. Yeung || FLO || align=right | 1.0 km || 
|-id=359 bgcolor=#fefefe
| 154359 ||  || — || December 10, 2002 || Socorro || LINEAR || — || align=right | 1.2 km || 
|-id=360 bgcolor=#fefefe
| 154360 ||  || — || December 10, 2002 || Palomar || NEAT || NYS || align=right data-sort-value="0.93" | 930 m || 
|-id=361 bgcolor=#fefefe
| 154361 ||  || — || December 10, 2002 || Palomar || NEAT || — || align=right | 1.8 km || 
|-id=362 bgcolor=#fefefe
| 154362 ||  || — || December 11, 2002 || Socorro || LINEAR || V || align=right | 1.1 km || 
|-id=363 bgcolor=#fefefe
| 154363 ||  || — || December 10, 2002 || Socorro || LINEAR || — || align=right | 1.3 km || 
|-id=364 bgcolor=#fefefe
| 154364 ||  || — || December 11, 2002 || Socorro || LINEAR || NYS || align=right | 2.7 km || 
|-id=365 bgcolor=#fefefe
| 154365 ||  || — || December 11, 2002 || Socorro || LINEAR || — || align=right | 3.6 km || 
|-id=366 bgcolor=#fefefe
| 154366 ||  || — || December 11, 2002 || Socorro || LINEAR || — || align=right | 1.5 km || 
|-id=367 bgcolor=#fefefe
| 154367 ||  || — || December 10, 2002 || Socorro || LINEAR || — || align=right | 1.4 km || 
|-id=368 bgcolor=#fefefe
| 154368 ||  || — || December 11, 2002 || Socorro || LINEAR || — || align=right | 1.6 km || 
|-id=369 bgcolor=#fefefe
| 154369 ||  || — || December 11, 2002 || Socorro || LINEAR || — || align=right | 1.4 km || 
|-id=370 bgcolor=#fefefe
| 154370 ||  || — || December 11, 2002 || Socorro || LINEAR || — || align=right | 1.3 km || 
|-id=371 bgcolor=#fefefe
| 154371 ||  || — || December 13, 2002 || Palomar || NEAT || — || align=right | 1.5 km || 
|-id=372 bgcolor=#fefefe
| 154372 ||  || — || December 12, 2002 || Palomar || NEAT || — || align=right | 2.5 km || 
|-id=373 bgcolor=#fefefe
| 154373 ||  || — || December 11, 2002 || Socorro || LINEAR || — || align=right | 1.0 km || 
|-id=374 bgcolor=#fefefe
| 154374 ||  || — || December 11, 2002 || Socorro || LINEAR || — || align=right | 1.6 km || 
|-id=375 bgcolor=#fefefe
| 154375 ||  || — || December 11, 2002 || Socorro || LINEAR || — || align=right | 2.7 km || 
|-id=376 bgcolor=#fefefe
| 154376 ||  || — || December 6, 2002 || Socorro || LINEAR || — || align=right | 2.0 km || 
|-id=377 bgcolor=#fefefe
| 154377 ||  || — || December 6, 2002 || Socorro || LINEAR || NYS || align=right | 1.0 km || 
|-id=378 bgcolor=#fefefe
| 154378 Hennessy ||  ||  || December 14, 2002 || Apache Point || SDSS || MAS || align=right | 1.5 km || 
|-id=379 bgcolor=#fefefe
| 154379 ||  || — || December 28, 2002 || Kitt Peak || Spacewatch || — || align=right | 1.6 km || 
|-id=380 bgcolor=#fefefe
| 154380 ||  || — || December 31, 2002 || Socorro || LINEAR || — || align=right | 1.1 km || 
|-id=381 bgcolor=#fefefe
| 154381 ||  || — || December 31, 2002 || Socorro || LINEAR || MAS || align=right | 1.5 km || 
|-id=382 bgcolor=#fefefe
| 154382 ||  || — || December 31, 2002 || Socorro || LINEAR || NYS || align=right data-sort-value="0.95" | 950 m || 
|-id=383 bgcolor=#fefefe
| 154383 ||  || — || December 31, 2002 || Socorro || LINEAR || NYS || align=right | 2.6 km || 
|-id=384 bgcolor=#fefefe
| 154384 ||  || — || December 31, 2002 || Socorro || LINEAR || — || align=right | 1.6 km || 
|-id=385 bgcolor=#fefefe
| 154385 ||  || — || January 2, 2003 || Kitt Peak || Spacewatch || — || align=right | 1.4 km || 
|-id=386 bgcolor=#fefefe
| 154386 ||  || — || January 4, 2003 || Socorro || LINEAR || EUT || align=right | 1.1 km || 
|-id=387 bgcolor=#fefefe
| 154387 ||  || — || January 1, 2003 || Socorro || LINEAR || — || align=right | 2.5 km || 
|-id=388 bgcolor=#fefefe
| 154388 ||  || — || January 5, 2003 || Socorro || LINEAR || — || align=right | 2.3 km || 
|-id=389 bgcolor=#fefefe
| 154389 ||  || — || January 3, 2003 || Kitt Peak || Spacewatch || — || align=right | 1.6 km || 
|-id=390 bgcolor=#fefefe
| 154390 ||  || — || January 4, 2003 || Socorro || LINEAR || NYS || align=right data-sort-value="0.91" | 910 m || 
|-id=391 bgcolor=#fefefe
| 154391 ||  || — || January 5, 2003 || Socorro || LINEAR || — || align=right | 1.2 km || 
|-id=392 bgcolor=#fefefe
| 154392 ||  || — || January 4, 2003 || Socorro || LINEAR || NYS || align=right data-sort-value="0.89" | 890 m || 
|-id=393 bgcolor=#fefefe
| 154393 ||  || — || January 4, 2003 || Socorro || LINEAR || — || align=right | 1.3 km || 
|-id=394 bgcolor=#fefefe
| 154394 ||  || — || January 4, 2003 || Socorro || LINEAR || MAS || align=right | 1.5 km || 
|-id=395 bgcolor=#fefefe
| 154395 ||  || — || January 4, 2003 || Socorro || LINEAR || ERI || align=right | 3.3 km || 
|-id=396 bgcolor=#fefefe
| 154396 ||  || — || January 5, 2003 || Socorro || LINEAR || NYS || align=right | 1.1 km || 
|-id=397 bgcolor=#fefefe
| 154397 ||  || — || January 7, 2003 || Socorro || LINEAR || — || align=right | 1.1 km || 
|-id=398 bgcolor=#fefefe
| 154398 ||  || — || January 7, 2003 || Socorro || LINEAR || — || align=right | 1.6 km || 
|-id=399 bgcolor=#fefefe
| 154399 ||  || — || January 7, 2003 || Socorro || LINEAR || — || align=right | 1.3 km || 
|-id=400 bgcolor=#fefefe
| 154400 ||  || — || January 5, 2003 || Socorro || LINEAR || NYS || align=right | 2.8 km || 
|}

154401–154500 

|-bgcolor=#fefefe
| 154401 ||  || — || January 5, 2003 || Socorro || LINEAR || — || align=right | 1.6 km || 
|-id=402 bgcolor=#fefefe
| 154402 ||  || — || January 5, 2003 || Socorro || LINEAR || NYS || align=right | 1.0 km || 
|-id=403 bgcolor=#fefefe
| 154403 ||  || — || January 5, 2003 || Socorro || LINEAR || NYS || align=right | 1.1 km || 
|-id=404 bgcolor=#fefefe
| 154404 ||  || — || January 5, 2003 || Socorro || LINEAR || NYS || align=right | 1.6 km || 
|-id=405 bgcolor=#fefefe
| 154405 ||  || — || January 5, 2003 || Socorro || LINEAR || — || align=right | 1.5 km || 
|-id=406 bgcolor=#fefefe
| 154406 ||  || — || January 5, 2003 || Socorro || LINEAR || — || align=right | 1.4 km || 
|-id=407 bgcolor=#fefefe
| 154407 ||  || — || January 5, 2003 || Socorro || LINEAR || — || align=right | 1.6 km || 
|-id=408 bgcolor=#E9E9E9
| 154408 ||  || — || January 10, 2003 || Socorro || LINEAR || HNS || align=right | 2.1 km || 
|-id=409 bgcolor=#fefefe
| 154409 ||  || — || January 10, 2003 || Socorro || LINEAR || — || align=right | 1.7 km || 
|-id=410 bgcolor=#fefefe
| 154410 ||  || — || January 10, 2003 || Socorro || LINEAR || — || align=right | 2.9 km || 
|-id=411 bgcolor=#fefefe
| 154411 ||  || — || January 11, 2003 || Socorro || LINEAR || — || align=right | 1.5 km || 
|-id=412 bgcolor=#fefefe
| 154412 ||  || — || January 8, 2003 || Bergisch Gladbach || W. Bickel || — || align=right | 1.1 km || 
|-id=413 bgcolor=#fefefe
| 154413 ||  || — || January 26, 2003 || Anderson Mesa || LONEOS || — || align=right | 1.2 km || 
|-id=414 bgcolor=#fefefe
| 154414 ||  || — || January 26, 2003 || Anderson Mesa || LONEOS || NYS || align=right | 1.3 km || 
|-id=415 bgcolor=#fefefe
| 154415 ||  || — || January 26, 2003 || Haleakala || NEAT || SUL || align=right | 3.3 km || 
|-id=416 bgcolor=#fefefe
| 154416 ||  || — || January 27, 2003 || Anderson Mesa || LONEOS || FLO || align=right | 1.3 km || 
|-id=417 bgcolor=#C2FFFF
| 154417 ||  || — || January 26, 2003 || Palomar || NEAT || L5 || align=right | 21 km || 
|-id=418 bgcolor=#fefefe
| 154418 ||  || — || January 26, 2003 || Anderson Mesa || LONEOS || NYS || align=right | 1.2 km || 
|-id=419 bgcolor=#fefefe
| 154419 ||  || — || January 26, 2003 || Anderson Mesa || LONEOS || — || align=right | 1.6 km || 
|-id=420 bgcolor=#fefefe
| 154420 ||  || — || January 27, 2003 || Socorro || LINEAR || NYS || align=right | 1.1 km || 
|-id=421 bgcolor=#fefefe
| 154421 ||  || — || January 27, 2003 || Haleakala || NEAT || — || align=right | 2.3 km || 
|-id=422 bgcolor=#fefefe
| 154422 ||  || — || January 27, 2003 || Socorro || LINEAR || NYS || align=right | 1.2 km || 
|-id=423 bgcolor=#fefefe
| 154423 ||  || — || January 28, 2003 || Socorro || LINEAR || — || align=right | 1.5 km || 
|-id=424 bgcolor=#fefefe
| 154424 ||  || — || January 28, 2003 || Socorro || LINEAR || V || align=right | 1.2 km || 
|-id=425 bgcolor=#fefefe
| 154425 ||  || — || January 27, 2003 || Socorro || LINEAR || NYS || align=right | 1.0 km || 
|-id=426 bgcolor=#fefefe
| 154426 ||  || — || January 29, 2003 || Palomar || NEAT || — || align=right | 1.5 km || 
|-id=427 bgcolor=#fefefe
| 154427 ||  || — || January 27, 2003 || Anderson Mesa || LONEOS || NYS || align=right | 1.1 km || 
|-id=428 bgcolor=#fefefe
| 154428 ||  || — || January 27, 2003 || Anderson Mesa || LONEOS || ERI || align=right | 2.5 km || 
|-id=429 bgcolor=#fefefe
| 154429 ||  || — || January 27, 2003 || Socorro || LINEAR || V || align=right | 1.2 km || 
|-id=430 bgcolor=#fefefe
| 154430 ||  || — || January 27, 2003 || Socorro || LINEAR || — || align=right | 1.1 km || 
|-id=431 bgcolor=#fefefe
| 154431 ||  || — || January 27, 2003 || Socorro || LINEAR || MAS || align=right | 1.5 km || 
|-id=432 bgcolor=#fefefe
| 154432 ||  || — || January 27, 2003 || Socorro || LINEAR || NYS || align=right | 1.2 km || 
|-id=433 bgcolor=#fefefe
| 154433 ||  || — || January 27, 2003 || Haleakala || NEAT || NYS || align=right | 1.4 km || 
|-id=434 bgcolor=#fefefe
| 154434 ||  || — || January 28, 2003 || Haleakala || NEAT || FLO || align=right | 1.2 km || 
|-id=435 bgcolor=#fefefe
| 154435 ||  || — || January 27, 2003 || Socorro || LINEAR || NYS || align=right | 2.5 km || 
|-id=436 bgcolor=#fefefe
| 154436 ||  || — || January 30, 2003 || Kitt Peak || Spacewatch || NYS || align=right | 1.3 km || 
|-id=437 bgcolor=#fefefe
| 154437 ||  || — || January 27, 2003 || Socorro || LINEAR || NYS || align=right data-sort-value="0.76" | 760 m || 
|-id=438 bgcolor=#fefefe
| 154438 ||  || — || January 30, 2003 || Anderson Mesa || LONEOS || NYS || align=right | 2.2 km || 
|-id=439 bgcolor=#fefefe
| 154439 ||  || — || January 30, 2003 || Anderson Mesa || LONEOS || — || align=right | 1.7 km || 
|-id=440 bgcolor=#fefefe
| 154440 ||  || — || January 31, 2003 || Anderson Mesa || LONEOS || — || align=right | 2.0 km || 
|-id=441 bgcolor=#fefefe
| 154441 ||  || — || January 30, 2003 || Anderson Mesa || LONEOS || — || align=right | 1.3 km || 
|-id=442 bgcolor=#fefefe
| 154442 ||  || — || January 31, 2003 || Socorro || LINEAR || V || align=right | 1.0 km || 
|-id=443 bgcolor=#fefefe
| 154443 ||  || — || January 31, 2003 || Socorro || LINEAR || MAS || align=right | 1.1 km || 
|-id=444 bgcolor=#E9E9E9
| 154444 ||  || — || January 31, 2003 || Socorro || LINEAR || — || align=right | 1.7 km || 
|-id=445 bgcolor=#fefefe
| 154445 ||  || — || January 30, 2003 || Haleakala || NEAT || V || align=right | 1.1 km || 
|-id=446 bgcolor=#fefefe
| 154446 ||  || — || February 1, 2003 || Kitt Peak || Spacewatch || EUT || align=right data-sort-value="0.90" | 900 m || 
|-id=447 bgcolor=#fefefe
| 154447 ||  || — || February 1, 2003 || Socorro || LINEAR || NYS || align=right | 1.1 km || 
|-id=448 bgcolor=#fefefe
| 154448 ||  || — || February 1, 2003 || Socorro || LINEAR || NYS || align=right | 3.4 km || 
|-id=449 bgcolor=#fefefe
| 154449 ||  || — || February 1, 2003 || Anderson Mesa || LONEOS || — || align=right | 1.6 km || 
|-id=450 bgcolor=#fefefe
| 154450 ||  || — || February 1, 2003 || Socorro || LINEAR || — || align=right | 2.1 km || 
|-id=451 bgcolor=#E9E9E9
| 154451 ||  || — || February 2, 2003 || Socorro || LINEAR || — || align=right | 1.6 km || 
|-id=452 bgcolor=#fefefe
| 154452 ||  || — || February 3, 2003 || Socorro || LINEAR || NYS || align=right | 1.0 km || 
|-id=453 bgcolor=#FFC2E0
| 154453 ||  || — || February 3, 2003 || Anderson Mesa || LONEOS || APO +1km || align=right | 3.2 km || 
|-id=454 bgcolor=#fefefe
| 154454 ||  || — || February 2, 2003 || Palomar || NEAT || MAS || align=right data-sort-value="0.91" | 910 m || 
|-id=455 bgcolor=#fefefe
| 154455 ||  || — || February 2, 2003 || Palomar || NEAT || V || align=right | 1.1 km || 
|-id=456 bgcolor=#fefefe
| 154456 ||  || — || February 8, 2003 || Socorro || LINEAR || — || align=right | 1.4 km || 
|-id=457 bgcolor=#fefefe
| 154457 ||  || — || February 8, 2003 || Socorro || LINEAR || NYS || align=right data-sort-value="0.80" | 800 m || 
|-id=458 bgcolor=#fefefe
| 154458 ||  || — || February 8, 2003 || Socorro || LINEAR || NYS || align=right | 1.1 km || 
|-id=459 bgcolor=#fefefe
| 154459 ||  || — || February 21, 2003 || Palomar || NEAT || — || align=right | 1.3 km || 
|-id=460 bgcolor=#fefefe
| 154460 ||  || — || February 21, 2003 || Palomar || NEAT || NYS || align=right | 2.8 km || 
|-id=461 bgcolor=#E9E9E9
| 154461 ||  || — || February 19, 2003 || Palomar || NEAT || — || align=right | 2.4 km || 
|-id=462 bgcolor=#E9E9E9
| 154462 ||  || — || February 22, 2003 || Kitt Peak || Spacewatch || RAF || align=right | 1.3 km || 
|-id=463 bgcolor=#fefefe
| 154463 ||  || — || February 24, 2003 || Modra || Š. Gajdoš || NYS || align=right | 1.2 km || 
|-id=464 bgcolor=#fefefe
| 154464 ||  || — || February 26, 2003 || Campo Imperatore || CINEOS || MAS || align=right data-sort-value="0.88" | 880 m || 
|-id=465 bgcolor=#E9E9E9
| 154465 ||  || — || February 22, 2003 || Palomar || NEAT || — || align=right | 1.5 km || 
|-id=466 bgcolor=#E9E9E9
| 154466 ||  || — || February 26, 2003 || Haleakala || NEAT || — || align=right | 6.1 km || 
|-id=467 bgcolor=#fefefe
| 154467 ||  || — || February 27, 2003 || Haleakala || NEAT || EUT || align=right | 1.2 km || 
|-id=468 bgcolor=#E9E9E9
| 154468 ||  || — || February 28, 2003 || Kleť || Kleť Obs. || — || align=right | 2.1 km || 
|-id=469 bgcolor=#fefefe
| 154469 ||  || — || February 22, 2003 || Goodricke-Pigott || J. W. Kessel || — || align=right | 2.8 km || 
|-id=470 bgcolor=#E9E9E9
| 154470 ||  || — || February 22, 2003 || Palomar || NEAT || — || align=right | 1.4 km || 
|-id=471 bgcolor=#fefefe
| 154471 ||  || — || February 22, 2003 || Palomar || NEAT || — || align=right | 1.5 km || 
|-id=472 bgcolor=#E9E9E9
| 154472 ||  || — || February 22, 2003 || Palomar || NEAT || — || align=right | 1.8 km || 
|-id=473 bgcolor=#fefefe
| 154473 ||  || — || February 22, 2003 || Kitt Peak || Spacewatch || MAS || align=right data-sort-value="0.84" | 840 m || 
|-id=474 bgcolor=#fefefe
| 154474 ||  || — || March 5, 2003 || Socorro || LINEAR || MAS || align=right | 1.5 km || 
|-id=475 bgcolor=#fefefe
| 154475 ||  || — || March 5, 2003 || Socorro || LINEAR || MAS || align=right | 1.2 km || 
|-id=476 bgcolor=#E9E9E9
| 154476 ||  || — || March 6, 2003 || Palomar || NEAT || — || align=right | 1.8 km || 
|-id=477 bgcolor=#fefefe
| 154477 ||  || — || March 5, 2003 || Socorro || LINEAR || NYS || align=right | 1.3 km || 
|-id=478 bgcolor=#fefefe
| 154478 ||  || — || March 6, 2003 || Socorro || LINEAR || — || align=right | 1.9 km || 
|-id=479 bgcolor=#fefefe
| 154479 ||  || — || March 6, 2003 || Socorro || LINEAR || — || align=right | 1.6 km || 
|-id=480 bgcolor=#fefefe
| 154480 ||  || — || March 6, 2003 || Anderson Mesa || LONEOS || SUL || align=right | 3.6 km || 
|-id=481 bgcolor=#fefefe
| 154481 ||  || — || March 6, 2003 || Socorro || LINEAR || — || align=right | 1.3 km || 
|-id=482 bgcolor=#fefefe
| 154482 ||  || — || March 6, 2003 || Anderson Mesa || LONEOS || CLA || align=right | 3.3 km || 
|-id=483 bgcolor=#E9E9E9
| 154483 ||  || — || March 6, 2003 || Socorro || LINEAR || — || align=right | 5.2 km || 
|-id=484 bgcolor=#E9E9E9
| 154484 ||  || — || March 6, 2003 || Palomar || NEAT || — || align=right | 1.5 km || 
|-id=485 bgcolor=#fefefe
| 154485 ||  || — || March 7, 2003 || Anderson Mesa || LONEOS || — || align=right | 2.1 km || 
|-id=486 bgcolor=#E9E9E9
| 154486 ||  || — || March 7, 2003 || Anderson Mesa || LONEOS || — || align=right | 2.4 km || 
|-id=487 bgcolor=#fefefe
| 154487 ||  || — || March 7, 2003 || Anderson Mesa || LONEOS || — || align=right | 2.6 km || 
|-id=488 bgcolor=#E9E9E9
| 154488 ||  || — || March 7, 2003 || Anderson Mesa || LONEOS || — || align=right | 1.8 km || 
|-id=489 bgcolor=#E9E9E9
| 154489 ||  || — || March 7, 2003 || Goodricke-Pigott || R. A. Tucker || BAR || align=right | 1.8 km || 
|-id=490 bgcolor=#E9E9E9
| 154490 ||  || — || March 15, 2003 || Haleakala || NEAT || — || align=right | 3.1 km || 
|-id=491 bgcolor=#E9E9E9
| 154491 ||  || — || March 24, 2003 || Cordell-Lorenz || Cordell–Lorenz Obs. || — || align=right | 1.3 km || 
|-id=492 bgcolor=#E9E9E9
| 154492 ||  || — || March 26, 2003 || Palomar || NEAT || — || align=right | 2.8 km || 
|-id=493 bgcolor=#E9E9E9
| 154493 Portisch ||  ||  || March 27, 2003 || Piszkéstető || K. Sárneczky || — || align=right | 1.7 km || 
|-id=494 bgcolor=#fefefe
| 154494 ||  || — || March 23, 2003 || Kitt Peak || Spacewatch || NYS || align=right | 1.4 km || 
|-id=495 bgcolor=#E9E9E9
| 154495 ||  || — || March 23, 2003 || Palomar || NEAT || — || align=right | 2.0 km || 
|-id=496 bgcolor=#fefefe
| 154496 ||  || — || March 24, 2003 || Kitt Peak || Spacewatch || NYS || align=right | 1.3 km || 
|-id=497 bgcolor=#E9E9E9
| 154497 ||  || — || March 23, 2003 || Haleakala || NEAT || EUN || align=right | 1.9 km || 
|-id=498 bgcolor=#E9E9E9
| 154498 ||  || — || March 24, 2003 || Kitt Peak || Spacewatch || — || align=right | 1.5 km || 
|-id=499 bgcolor=#fefefe
| 154499 ||  || — || March 24, 2003 || Kitt Peak || Spacewatch || NYS || align=right | 1.2 km || 
|-id=500 bgcolor=#E9E9E9
| 154500 ||  || — || March 24, 2003 || Kitt Peak || Spacewatch || — || align=right | 2.5 km || 
|}

154501–154600 

|-bgcolor=#E9E9E9
| 154501 ||  || — || March 25, 2003 || Haleakala || NEAT || GEF || align=right | 2.3 km || 
|-id=502 bgcolor=#E9E9E9
| 154502 ||  || — || March 30, 2003 || Socorro || LINEAR || — || align=right | 3.4 km || 
|-id=503 bgcolor=#E9E9E9
| 154503 ||  || — || March 23, 2003 || Kitt Peak || Spacewatch || — || align=right | 1.9 km || 
|-id=504 bgcolor=#E9E9E9
| 154504 ||  || — || March 24, 2003 || Kitt Peak || Spacewatch || — || align=right | 2.5 km || 
|-id=505 bgcolor=#fefefe
| 154505 ||  || — || March 25, 2003 || Palomar || NEAT || LCI || align=right | 2.2 km || 
|-id=506 bgcolor=#E9E9E9
| 154506 ||  || — || March 30, 2003 || Socorro || LINEAR || BAR || align=right | 2.6 km || 
|-id=507 bgcolor=#E9E9E9
| 154507 ||  || — || March 24, 2003 || Kitt Peak || Spacewatch || — || align=right | 2.0 km || 
|-id=508 bgcolor=#E9E9E9
| 154508 ||  || — || March 24, 2003 || Haleakala || NEAT || — || align=right | 3.6 km || 
|-id=509 bgcolor=#E9E9E9
| 154509 ||  || — || March 25, 2003 || Haleakala || NEAT || — || align=right | 1.8 km || 
|-id=510 bgcolor=#E9E9E9
| 154510 ||  || — || March 26, 2003 || Palomar || NEAT || — || align=right | 1.4 km || 
|-id=511 bgcolor=#E9E9E9
| 154511 ||  || — || March 26, 2003 || Palomar || NEAT || — || align=right | 3.8 km || 
|-id=512 bgcolor=#fefefe
| 154512 ||  || — || March 26, 2003 || Palomar || NEAT || NYS || align=right data-sort-value="0.96" | 960 m || 
|-id=513 bgcolor=#E9E9E9
| 154513 ||  || — || March 26, 2003 || Kitt Peak || Spacewatch || — || align=right | 2.5 km || 
|-id=514 bgcolor=#E9E9E9
| 154514 ||  || — || March 26, 2003 || Palomar || NEAT || EUN || align=right | 2.0 km || 
|-id=515 bgcolor=#E9E9E9
| 154515 ||  || — || March 26, 2003 || Palomar || NEAT || — || align=right | 2.1 km || 
|-id=516 bgcolor=#E9E9E9
| 154516 ||  || — || March 26, 2003 || Socorro || LINEAR || — || align=right | 2.1 km || 
|-id=517 bgcolor=#E9E9E9
| 154517 ||  || — || March 26, 2003 || Palomar || NEAT || — || align=right | 1.5 km || 
|-id=518 bgcolor=#fefefe
| 154518 ||  || — || March 26, 2003 || Kitt Peak || Spacewatch || — || align=right | 1.5 km || 
|-id=519 bgcolor=#fefefe
| 154519 ||  || — || March 27, 2003 || Socorro || LINEAR || — || align=right | 2.2 km || 
|-id=520 bgcolor=#E9E9E9
| 154520 ||  || — || March 27, 2003 || Palomar || NEAT || — || align=right | 4.1 km || 
|-id=521 bgcolor=#E9E9E9
| 154521 ||  || — || March 27, 2003 || Campo Imperatore || CINEOS || — || align=right | 2.1 km || 
|-id=522 bgcolor=#fefefe
| 154522 ||  || — || March 29, 2003 || Anderson Mesa || LONEOS || LCI || align=right | 2.5 km || 
|-id=523 bgcolor=#E9E9E9
| 154523 ||  || — || March 29, 2003 || Anderson Mesa || LONEOS || — || align=right | 2.7 km || 
|-id=524 bgcolor=#E9E9E9
| 154524 ||  || — || March 30, 2003 || Socorro || LINEAR || — || align=right | 3.5 km || 
|-id=525 bgcolor=#E9E9E9
| 154525 ||  || — || March 27, 2003 || Anderson Mesa || LONEOS || — || align=right | 2.9 km || 
|-id=526 bgcolor=#E9E9E9
| 154526 ||  || — || March 30, 2003 || Socorro || LINEAR || JUN || align=right | 5.4 km || 
|-id=527 bgcolor=#E9E9E9
| 154527 ||  || — || March 31, 2003 || Anderson Mesa || LONEOS || — || align=right | 2.4 km || 
|-id=528 bgcolor=#E9E9E9
| 154528 ||  || — || March 31, 2003 || Socorro || LINEAR || MAR || align=right | 2.4 km || 
|-id=529 bgcolor=#E9E9E9
| 154529 ||  || — || March 31, 2003 || Anderson Mesa || LONEOS || — || align=right | 4.0 km || 
|-id=530 bgcolor=#E9E9E9
| 154530 ||  || — || March 31, 2003 || Anderson Mesa || LONEOS || EUN || align=right | 2.3 km || 
|-id=531 bgcolor=#E9E9E9
| 154531 ||  || — || March 24, 2003 || Kitt Peak || Spacewatch || — || align=right | 3.1 km || 
|-id=532 bgcolor=#E9E9E9
| 154532 ||  || — || March 25, 2003 || Anderson Mesa || LONEOS || — || align=right | 1.4 km || 
|-id=533 bgcolor=#E9E9E9
| 154533 ||  || — || March 25, 2003 || Anderson Mesa || LONEOS || ADE || align=right | 3.2 km || 
|-id=534 bgcolor=#E9E9E9
| 154534 ||  || — || March 31, 2003 || Catalina || CSS || — || align=right | 1.6 km || 
|-id=535 bgcolor=#E9E9E9
| 154535 ||  || — || April 1, 2003 || Socorro || LINEAR || — || align=right | 1.7 km || 
|-id=536 bgcolor=#E9E9E9
| 154536 ||  || — || April 1, 2003 || Socorro || LINEAR || RAF || align=right | 1.6 km || 
|-id=537 bgcolor=#E9E9E9
| 154537 ||  || — || April 2, 2003 || Haleakala || NEAT || — || align=right | 1.8 km || 
|-id=538 bgcolor=#E9E9E9
| 154538 ||  || — || April 1, 2003 || Socorro || LINEAR || — || align=right | 1.5 km || 
|-id=539 bgcolor=#E9E9E9
| 154539 ||  || — || April 3, 2003 || Anderson Mesa || LONEOS || — || align=right | 3.1 km || 
|-id=540 bgcolor=#E9E9E9
| 154540 ||  || — || April 2, 2003 || Haleakala || NEAT || — || align=right | 1.6 km || 
|-id=541 bgcolor=#E9E9E9
| 154541 ||  || — || April 2, 2003 || Haleakala || NEAT || — || align=right | 2.8 km || 
|-id=542 bgcolor=#E9E9E9
| 154542 ||  || — || April 4, 2003 || Kitt Peak || Spacewatch || — || align=right | 1.8 km || 
|-id=543 bgcolor=#E9E9E9
| 154543 ||  || — || April 4, 2003 || Kitt Peak || Spacewatch || — || align=right | 4.0 km || 
|-id=544 bgcolor=#E9E9E9
| 154544 ||  || — || April 4, 2003 || Cerro Tololo || DLS || AER || align=right | 2.0 km || 
|-id=545 bgcolor=#E9E9E9
| 154545 ||  || — || April 8, 2003 || Socorro || LINEAR || — || align=right | 3.2 km || 
|-id=546 bgcolor=#E9E9E9
| 154546 ||  || — || April 5, 2003 || Kitt Peak || Spacewatch || — || align=right | 1.3 km || 
|-id=547 bgcolor=#E9E9E9
| 154547 ||  || — || April 6, 2003 || Anderson Mesa || LONEOS || — || align=right | 1.6 km || 
|-id=548 bgcolor=#E9E9E9
| 154548 ||  || — || April 7, 2003 || Socorro || LINEAR || — || align=right | 1.4 km || 
|-id=549 bgcolor=#E9E9E9
| 154549 ||  || — || April 5, 2003 || Anderson Mesa || LONEOS || JUN || align=right | 3.9 km || 
|-id=550 bgcolor=#E9E9E9
| 154550 ||  || — || April 9, 2003 || Socorro || LINEAR || — || align=right | 3.7 km || 
|-id=551 bgcolor=#E9E9E9
| 154551 ||  || — || April 9, 2003 || Socorro || LINEAR || — || align=right | 5.8 km || 
|-id=552 bgcolor=#E9E9E9
| 154552 ||  || — || April 8, 2003 || Socorro || LINEAR || — || align=right | 1.4 km || 
|-id=553 bgcolor=#E9E9E9
| 154553 ||  || — || April 5, 2003 || Kitt Peak || Spacewatch || — || align=right | 2.9 km || 
|-id=554 bgcolor=#E9E9E9
| 154554 Heatherelliott ||  ||  || April 1, 2003 || Kitt Peak || M. W. Buie || — || align=right | 3.2 km || 
|-id=555 bgcolor=#FFC2E0
| 154555 || 2003 HA || — || April 21, 2003 || Socorro || LINEAR || APO +1km || align=right | 1.6 km || 
|-id=556 bgcolor=#E9E9E9
| 154556 ||  || — || April 22, 2003 || Goodricke-Pigott || J. W. Kessel || EUN || align=right | 2.7 km || 
|-id=557 bgcolor=#E9E9E9
| 154557 ||  || — || April 24, 2003 || Anderson Mesa || LONEOS || — || align=right | 2.7 km || 
|-id=558 bgcolor=#E9E9E9
| 154558 ||  || — || April 25, 2003 || Anderson Mesa || LONEOS || — || align=right | 3.6 km || 
|-id=559 bgcolor=#E9E9E9
| 154559 ||  || — || April 25, 2003 || Anderson Mesa || LONEOS || PAE || align=right | 4.9 km || 
|-id=560 bgcolor=#E9E9E9
| 154560 ||  || — || April 25, 2003 || Anderson Mesa || LONEOS || — || align=right | 4.8 km || 
|-id=561 bgcolor=#E9E9E9
| 154561 ||  || — || April 24, 2003 || Anderson Mesa || LONEOS || — || align=right | 3.4 km || 
|-id=562 bgcolor=#E9E9E9
| 154562 ||  || — || April 26, 2003 || Kitt Peak || Spacewatch || — || align=right | 2.3 km || 
|-id=563 bgcolor=#E9E9E9
| 154563 ||  || — || April 25, 2003 || Kitt Peak || Spacewatch || — || align=right | 1.5 km || 
|-id=564 bgcolor=#E9E9E9
| 154564 ||  || — || April 26, 2003 || Haleakala || NEAT || — || align=right | 5.2 km || 
|-id=565 bgcolor=#E9E9E9
| 154565 ||  || — || April 28, 2003 || Socorro || LINEAR || — || align=right | 3.2 km || 
|-id=566 bgcolor=#E9E9E9
| 154566 ||  || — || April 28, 2003 || Haleakala || NEAT || JUN || align=right | 1.9 km || 
|-id=567 bgcolor=#E9E9E9
| 154567 ||  || — || April 26, 2003 || Kitt Peak || Spacewatch || EUN || align=right | 1.5 km || 
|-id=568 bgcolor=#E9E9E9
| 154568 ||  || — || April 26, 2003 || Socorro || LINEAR || — || align=right | 3.3 km || 
|-id=569 bgcolor=#E9E9E9
| 154569 ||  || — || April 26, 2003 || Kitt Peak || Spacewatch || — || align=right | 3.5 km || 
|-id=570 bgcolor=#E9E9E9
| 154570 ||  || — || April 28, 2003 || Kitt Peak || Spacewatch || — || align=right | 3.4 km || 
|-id=571 bgcolor=#E9E9E9
| 154571 ||  || — || April 29, 2003 || Socorro || LINEAR || — || align=right | 3.9 km || 
|-id=572 bgcolor=#E9E9E9
| 154572 ||  || — || April 29, 2003 || Socorro || LINEAR || — || align=right | 4.8 km || 
|-id=573 bgcolor=#E9E9E9
| 154573 ||  || — || April 29, 2003 || Socorro || LINEAR || RAF || align=right | 2.1 km || 
|-id=574 bgcolor=#E9E9E9
| 154574 ||  || — || April 27, 2003 || Anderson Mesa || LONEOS || — || align=right | 1.7 km || 
|-id=575 bgcolor=#E9E9E9
| 154575 ||  || — || April 30, 2003 || Kitt Peak || Spacewatch || — || align=right | 1.9 km || 
|-id=576 bgcolor=#E9E9E9
| 154576 ||  || — || April 28, 2003 || Socorro || LINEAR || — || align=right | 4.9 km || 
|-id=577 bgcolor=#E9E9E9
| 154577 ||  || — || April 24, 2003 || Anderson Mesa || LONEOS || — || align=right | 1.3 km || 
|-id=578 bgcolor=#E9E9E9
| 154578 ||  || — || April 24, 2003 || Anderson Mesa || LONEOS || — || align=right | 1.4 km || 
|-id=579 bgcolor=#E9E9E9
| 154579 ||  || — || April 25, 2003 || Kitt Peak || Spacewatch || — || align=right | 1.2 km || 
|-id=580 bgcolor=#E9E9E9
| 154580 ||  || — || April 23, 2003 || Bergisch Gladbach || Bergisch Gladbach Obs. || — || align=right | 1.1 km || 
|-id=581 bgcolor=#E9E9E9
| 154581 ||  || — || May 3, 2003 || Reedy Creek || J. Broughton || EUN || align=right | 2.8 km || 
|-id=582 bgcolor=#E9E9E9
| 154582 ||  || — || May 2, 2003 || Socorro || LINEAR || MAR || align=right | 2.1 km || 
|-id=583 bgcolor=#E9E9E9
| 154583 ||  || — || May 5, 2003 || Kitt Peak || Spacewatch || MIS || align=right | 3.6 km || 
|-id=584 bgcolor=#E9E9E9
| 154584 ||  || — || May 26, 2003 || Kitt Peak || Spacewatch || — || align=right | 4.2 km || 
|-id=585 bgcolor=#E9E9E9
| 154585 ||  || — || May 25, 2003 || Kitt Peak || Spacewatch || EUN || align=right | 2.0 km || 
|-id=586 bgcolor=#d6d6d6
| 154586 ||  || — || May 28, 2003 || Catalina || CSS || ITH || align=right | 2.1 km || 
|-id=587 bgcolor=#d6d6d6
| 154587 Ennico ||  ||  || May 30, 2003 || Cerro Tololo || M. W. Buie || KOR || align=right | 1.4 km || 
|-id=588 bgcolor=#E9E9E9
| 154588 ||  || — || May 26, 2003 || Kitt Peak || Spacewatch || HOF || align=right | 4.0 km || 
|-id=589 bgcolor=#FFC2E0
| 154589 ||  || — || June 25, 2003 || Socorro || LINEAR || AMO +1kmfast? || align=right | 1.1 km || 
|-id=590 bgcolor=#FFC2E0
| 154590 ||  || — || June 26, 2003 || Haleakala || NEAT || APOPHA || align=right data-sort-value="0.086" | 86 m || 
|-id=591 bgcolor=#E9E9E9
| 154591 ||  || — || June 26, 2003 || Socorro || LINEAR || EUN || align=right | 2.3 km || 
|-id=592 bgcolor=#d6d6d6
| 154592 ||  || — || July 2, 2003 || Socorro || LINEAR || — || align=right | 5.9 km || 
|-id=593 bgcolor=#E9E9E9
| 154593 ||  || — || July 3, 2003 || Kitt Peak || Spacewatch || — || align=right | 3.8 km || 
|-id=594 bgcolor=#d6d6d6
| 154594 || 2003 OB || — || July 18, 2003 || Siding Spring || R. H. McNaught || TIR || align=right | 4.1 km || 
|-id=595 bgcolor=#fefefe
| 154595 || 2003 OZ || — || July 20, 2003 || Socorro || LINEAR || PHO || align=right | 1.4 km || 
|-id=596 bgcolor=#d6d6d6
| 154596 ||  || — || July 24, 2003 || Campo Imperatore || CINEOS || HYG || align=right | 3.5 km || 
|-id=597 bgcolor=#d6d6d6
| 154597 ||  || — || July 23, 2003 || Palomar || NEAT || TIR || align=right | 4.1 km || 
|-id=598 bgcolor=#d6d6d6
| 154598 ||  || — || July 24, 2003 || Palomar || NEAT || KOR || align=right | 2.5 km || 
|-id=599 bgcolor=#d6d6d6
| 154599 ||  || — || July 24, 2003 || Palomar || NEAT || THM || align=right | 4.5 km || 
|-id=600 bgcolor=#d6d6d6
| 154600 ||  || — || August 2, 2003 || Haleakala || NEAT || — || align=right | 4.0 km || 
|}

154601–154700 

|-bgcolor=#d6d6d6
| 154601 ||  || — || August 2, 2003 || Haleakala || NEAT || — || align=right | 6.0 km || 
|-id=602 bgcolor=#d6d6d6
| 154602 ||  || — || August 1, 2003 || Socorro || LINEAR || — || align=right | 5.4 km || 
|-id=603 bgcolor=#d6d6d6
| 154603 ||  || — || August 22, 2003 || Palomar || NEAT || HIL3:2 || align=right | 11 km || 
|-id=604 bgcolor=#d6d6d6
| 154604 ||  || — || August 23, 2003 || Črni Vrh || Črni Vrh || MEL || align=right | 6.8 km || 
|-id=605 bgcolor=#d6d6d6
| 154605 ||  || — || August 22, 2003 || Palomar || NEAT || — || align=right | 3.9 km || 
|-id=606 bgcolor=#d6d6d6
| 154606 ||  || — || August 23, 2003 || Socorro || LINEAR || HYG || align=right | 5.3 km || 
|-id=607 bgcolor=#d6d6d6
| 154607 ||  || — || August 23, 2003 || Socorro || LINEAR || — || align=right | 5.5 km || 
|-id=608 bgcolor=#d6d6d6
| 154608 ||  || — || August 23, 2003 || Socorro || LINEAR || — || align=right | 6.2 km || 
|-id=609 bgcolor=#d6d6d6
| 154609 ||  || — || August 30, 2003 || Kitt Peak || Spacewatch || — || align=right | 3.4 km || 
|-id=610 bgcolor=#d6d6d6
| 154610 ||  || — || August 28, 2003 || Haleakala || NEAT || THM || align=right | 3.9 km || 
|-id=611 bgcolor=#d6d6d6
| 154611 ||  || — || September 2, 2003 || Socorro || LINEAR || — || align=right | 6.8 km || 
|-id=612 bgcolor=#fefefe
| 154612 ||  || — || September 16, 2003 || Palomar || NEAT || FLO || align=right data-sort-value="0.89" | 890 m || 
|-id=613 bgcolor=#d6d6d6
| 154613 ||  || — || September 16, 2003 || Anderson Mesa || LONEOS || 7:4 || align=right | 7.1 km || 
|-id=614 bgcolor=#d6d6d6
| 154614 ||  || — || September 17, 2003 || Anderson Mesa || LONEOS || TIR || align=right | 5.8 km || 
|-id=615 bgcolor=#d6d6d6
| 154615 ||  || — || September 17, 2003 || Anderson Mesa || LONEOS || — || align=right | 7.0 km || 
|-id=616 bgcolor=#d6d6d6
| 154616 ||  || — || September 21, 2003 || Socorro || LINEAR || — || align=right | 6.7 km || 
|-id=617 bgcolor=#d6d6d6
| 154617 ||  || — || September 19, 2003 || Anderson Mesa || LONEOS || — || align=right | 4.3 km || 
|-id=618 bgcolor=#d6d6d6
| 154618 ||  || — || September 18, 2003 || Palomar || NEAT || HYG || align=right | 5.1 km || 
|-id=619 bgcolor=#d6d6d6
| 154619 ||  || — || September 23, 2003 || Haleakala || NEAT || VER || align=right | 5.3 km || 
|-id=620 bgcolor=#d6d6d6
| 154620 ||  || — || September 22, 2003 || Anderson Mesa || LONEOS || — || align=right | 6.5 km || 
|-id=621 bgcolor=#d6d6d6
| 154621 ||  || — || September 22, 2003 || Kitt Peak || Spacewatch || 7:4 || align=right | 5.4 km || 
|-id=622 bgcolor=#d6d6d6
| 154622 ||  || — || September 23, 2003 || Palomar || NEAT || HYG || align=right | 5.2 km || 
|-id=623 bgcolor=#d6d6d6
| 154623 ||  || — || September 27, 2003 || Socorro || LINEAR || HYG || align=right | 4.9 km || 
|-id=624 bgcolor=#d6d6d6
| 154624 ||  || — || September 27, 2003 || Kitt Peak || Spacewatch || — || align=right | 4.8 km || 
|-id=625 bgcolor=#d6d6d6
| 154625 ||  || — || September 18, 2003 || Haleakala || NEAT || 7:4* || align=right | 8.2 km || 
|-id=626 bgcolor=#E9E9E9
| 154626 ||  || — || September 27, 2003 || Socorro || LINEAR || — || align=right | 3.0 km || 
|-id=627 bgcolor=#d6d6d6
| 154627 ||  || — || October 16, 2003 || Kitt Peak || Spacewatch || — || align=right | 4.3 km || 
|-id=628 bgcolor=#fefefe
| 154628 ||  || — || October 22, 2003 || Socorro || LINEAR || — || align=right | 1.3 km || 
|-id=629 bgcolor=#d6d6d6
| 154629 ||  || — || October 27, 2003 || Socorro || LINEAR || HIL3:2 || align=right | 8.2 km || 
|-id=630 bgcolor=#fefefe
| 154630 ||  || — || November 14, 2003 || Palomar || NEAT || H || align=right data-sort-value="0.93" | 930 m || 
|-id=631 bgcolor=#FFC2E0
| 154631 ||  || — || November 21, 2003 || Palomar || NEAT || APO +1km || align=right data-sort-value="0.84" | 840 m || 
|-id=632 bgcolor=#C2FFFF
| 154632 ||  || — || November 26, 2003 || Kitt Peak || Spacewatch || L5 || align=right | 17 km || 
|-id=633 bgcolor=#fefefe
| 154633 || 2003 XT || — || December 3, 2003 || Socorro || LINEAR || H || align=right | 1.2 km || 
|-id=634 bgcolor=#fefefe
| 154634 ||  || — || December 4, 2003 || Socorro || LINEAR || FLO || align=right | 1.0 km || 
|-id=635 bgcolor=#fefefe
| 154635 || 2003 YX || — || December 17, 2003 || Socorro || LINEAR || H || align=right | 1.2 km || 
|-id=636 bgcolor=#fefefe
| 154636 ||  || — || December 16, 2003 || Catalina || CSS || — || align=right | 1.3 km || 
|-id=637 bgcolor=#fefefe
| 154637 ||  || — || December 18, 2003 || Socorro || LINEAR || H || align=right | 1.0 km || 
|-id=638 bgcolor=#fefefe
| 154638 ||  || — || December 18, 2003 || Socorro || LINEAR || H || align=right | 1.1 km || 
|-id=639 bgcolor=#fefefe
| 154639 ||  || — || December 19, 2003 || Kitt Peak || Spacewatch || — || align=right | 1.2 km || 
|-id=640 bgcolor=#fefefe
| 154640 ||  || — || December 17, 2003 || Socorro || LINEAR || H || align=right | 1.7 km || 
|-id=641 bgcolor=#fefefe
| 154641 ||  || — || December 28, 2003 || Socorro || LINEAR || H || align=right | 1.1 km || 
|-id=642 bgcolor=#fefefe
| 154642 ||  || — || January 5, 2004 || Socorro || LINEAR || H || align=right | 1.3 km || 
|-id=643 bgcolor=#fefefe
| 154643 ||  || — || January 28, 2004 || Socorro || LINEAR || H || align=right | 1.0 km || 
|-id=644 bgcolor=#fefefe
| 154644 ||  || — || January 26, 2004 || Anderson Mesa || LONEOS || H || align=right data-sort-value="0.95" | 950 m || 
|-id=645 bgcolor=#fefefe
| 154645 ||  || — || January 28, 2004 || Catalina || CSS || V || align=right | 1.1 km || 
|-id=646 bgcolor=#fefefe
| 154646 ||  || — || January 28, 2004 || Catalina || CSS || H || align=right | 1.2 km || 
|-id=647 bgcolor=#fefefe
| 154647 ||  || — || February 11, 2004 || Anderson Mesa || LONEOS || FLO || align=right | 1.3 km || 
|-id=648 bgcolor=#fefefe
| 154648 ||  || — || February 19, 2004 || Socorro || LINEAR || H || align=right | 1.2 km || 
|-id=649 bgcolor=#fefefe
| 154649 ||  || — || February 19, 2004 || Socorro || LINEAR || H || align=right data-sort-value="0.99" | 990 m || 
|-id=650 bgcolor=#fefefe
| 154650 ||  || — || March 11, 2004 || Palomar || NEAT || — || align=right | 1.3 km || 
|-id=651 bgcolor=#fefefe
| 154651 ||  || — || March 12, 2004 || Palomar || NEAT || — || align=right | 1.2 km || 
|-id=652 bgcolor=#FFC2E0
| 154652 ||  || — || March 15, 2004 || Socorro || LINEAR || APO || align=right data-sort-value="0.63" | 630 m || 
|-id=653 bgcolor=#E9E9E9
| 154653 ||  || — || March 14, 2004 || Palomar || NEAT || MAR || align=right | 2.5 km || 
|-id=654 bgcolor=#E9E9E9
| 154654 ||  || — || March 15, 2004 || Socorro || LINEAR || — || align=right | 1.7 km || 
|-id=655 bgcolor=#fefefe
| 154655 ||  || — || March 15, 2004 || Kitt Peak || Spacewatch || — || align=right | 1.2 km || 
|-id=656 bgcolor=#FFC2E0
| 154656 ||  || — || March 17, 2004 || Socorro || LINEAR || APO +1km || align=right | 2.0 km || 
|-id=657 bgcolor=#fefefe
| 154657 ||  || — || March 17, 2004 || Kitt Peak || Spacewatch || NYS || align=right | 1.1 km || 
|-id=658 bgcolor=#FFC2E0
| 154658 ||  || — || March 27, 2004 || Anderson Mesa || LONEOS || APO || align=right data-sort-value="0.47" | 470 m || 
|-id=659 bgcolor=#fefefe
| 154659 ||  || — || March 16, 2004 || Catalina || CSS || — || align=right | 1.3 km || 
|-id=660 bgcolor=#fefefe
| 154660 Kavelaars ||  ||  || March 29, 2004 || Mauna Kea || D. D. Balam || H || align=right data-sort-value="0.78" | 780 m || 
|-id=661 bgcolor=#FA8072
| 154661 ||  || — || March 30, 2004 || Socorro || LINEAR || — || align=right | 2.6 km || 
|-id=662 bgcolor=#fefefe
| 154662 ||  || — || March 17, 2004 || Socorro || LINEAR || — || align=right | 1.3 km || 
|-id=663 bgcolor=#fefefe
| 154663 ||  || — || March 19, 2004 || Socorro || LINEAR || V || align=right | 1.1 km || 
|-id=664 bgcolor=#fefefe
| 154664 ||  || — || March 20, 2004 || Socorro || LINEAR || — || align=right | 1.5 km || 
|-id=665 bgcolor=#fefefe
| 154665 ||  || — || March 17, 2004 || Kitt Peak || Spacewatch || FLO || align=right | 1.0 km || 
|-id=666 bgcolor=#fefefe
| 154666 ||  || — || March 16, 2004 || Socorro || LINEAR || — || align=right | 1.7 km || 
|-id=667 bgcolor=#fefefe
| 154667 ||  || — || March 23, 2004 || Kitt Peak || Spacewatch || — || align=right | 1.5 km || 
|-id=668 bgcolor=#fefefe
| 154668 ||  || — || March 22, 2004 || Socorro || LINEAR || — || align=right | 1.1 km || 
|-id=669 bgcolor=#fefefe
| 154669 ||  || — || March 27, 2004 || Socorro || LINEAR || — || align=right | 1.1 km || 
|-id=670 bgcolor=#E9E9E9
| 154670 ||  || — || March 26, 2004 || Socorro || LINEAR || — || align=right | 4.3 km || 
|-id=671 bgcolor=#E9E9E9
| 154671 ||  || — || March 16, 2004 || Siding Spring || SSS || — || align=right | 3.2 km || 
|-id=672 bgcolor=#fefefe
| 154672 ||  || — || April 11, 2004 || Catalina || CSS || — || align=right data-sort-value="0.88" | 880 m || 
|-id=673 bgcolor=#fefefe
| 154673 ||  || — || April 11, 2004 || Palomar || NEAT || — || align=right | 1.6 km || 
|-id=674 bgcolor=#fefefe
| 154674 ||  || — || April 13, 2004 || Palomar || NEAT || — || align=right data-sort-value="0.97" | 970 m || 
|-id=675 bgcolor=#fefefe
| 154675 ||  || — || April 15, 2004 || Socorro || LINEAR || PHO || align=right | 2.0 km || 
|-id=676 bgcolor=#fefefe
| 154676 ||  || — || April 13, 2004 || Kitt Peak || Spacewatch || — || align=right | 1.2 km || 
|-id=677 bgcolor=#fefefe
| 154677 ||  || — || April 12, 2004 || Palomar || NEAT || — || align=right | 1.3 km || 
|-id=678 bgcolor=#fefefe
| 154678 ||  || — || April 12, 2004 || Palomar || NEAT || — || align=right | 2.0 km || 
|-id=679 bgcolor=#fefefe
| 154679 ||  || — || April 14, 2004 || Anderson Mesa || LONEOS || — || align=right data-sort-value="0.94" | 940 m || 
|-id=680 bgcolor=#fefefe
| 154680 ||  || — || April 14, 2004 || Anderson Mesa || LONEOS || — || align=right | 1.4 km || 
|-id=681 bgcolor=#fefefe
| 154681 ||  || — || April 14, 2004 || Anderson Mesa || LONEOS || — || align=right | 1.2 km || 
|-id=682 bgcolor=#fefefe
| 154682 ||  || — || April 12, 2004 || Kitt Peak || Spacewatch || NYS || align=right data-sort-value="0.88" | 880 m || 
|-id=683 bgcolor=#fefefe
| 154683 ||  || — || April 12, 2004 || Anderson Mesa || LONEOS || — || align=right | 2.0 km || 
|-id=684 bgcolor=#fefefe
| 154684 ||  || — || April 12, 2004 || Kitt Peak || Spacewatch || — || align=right | 1.3 km || 
|-id=685 bgcolor=#fefefe
| 154685 ||  || — || April 15, 2004 || Palomar || NEAT || — || align=right | 1.3 km || 
|-id=686 bgcolor=#fefefe
| 154686 ||  || — || April 9, 2004 || Siding Spring || SSS || FLO || align=right | 1.1 km || 
|-id=687 bgcolor=#fefefe
| 154687 || 2004 HS || — || April 17, 2004 || Socorro || LINEAR || — || align=right | 1.7 km || 
|-id=688 bgcolor=#fefefe
| 154688 ||  || — || April 20, 2004 || Desert Eagle || W. K. Y. Yeung || — || align=right | 1.3 km || 
|-id=689 bgcolor=#fefefe
| 154689 ||  || — || April 16, 2004 || Kitt Peak || Spacewatch || — || align=right | 1.2 km || 
|-id=690 bgcolor=#fefefe
| 154690 ||  || — || April 17, 2004 || Socorro || LINEAR || FLO || align=right | 1.0 km || 
|-id=691 bgcolor=#E9E9E9
| 154691 ||  || — || April 17, 2004 || Socorro || LINEAR || — || align=right | 2.5 km || 
|-id=692 bgcolor=#fefefe
| 154692 ||  || — || April 20, 2004 || Socorro || LINEAR || — || align=right data-sort-value="0.98" | 980 m || 
|-id=693 bgcolor=#fefefe
| 154693 ||  || — || April 21, 2004 || Socorro || LINEAR || — || align=right | 1.7 km || 
|-id=694 bgcolor=#fefefe
| 154694 ||  || — || April 22, 2004 || Siding Spring || SSS || FLO || align=right data-sort-value="0.95" | 950 m || 
|-id=695 bgcolor=#fefefe
| 154695 ||  || — || April 23, 2004 || Socorro || LINEAR || NYS || align=right | 1.0 km || 
|-id=696 bgcolor=#fefefe
| 154696 ||  || — || April 25, 2004 || Socorro || LINEAR || — || align=right | 1.2 km || 
|-id=697 bgcolor=#fefefe
| 154697 ||  || — || May 10, 2004 || Reedy Creek || J. Broughton || FLO || align=right data-sort-value="0.91" | 910 m || 
|-id=698 bgcolor=#fefefe
| 154698 ||  || — || May 12, 2004 || Siding Spring || SSS || FLO || align=right | 1.0 km || 
|-id=699 bgcolor=#d6d6d6
| 154699 ||  || — || May 13, 2004 || Anderson Mesa || LONEOS || — || align=right | 5.0 km || 
|-id=700 bgcolor=#fefefe
| 154700 ||  || — || May 8, 2004 || Palomar || NEAT || — || align=right | 1.1 km || 
|}

154701–154800 

|-bgcolor=#fefefe
| 154701 ||  || — || May 12, 2004 || Siding Spring || SSS || — || align=right | 1.4 km || 
|-id=702 bgcolor=#fefefe
| 154702 ||  || — || May 13, 2004 || Anderson Mesa || LONEOS || FLO || align=right data-sort-value="0.90" | 900 m || 
|-id=703 bgcolor=#fefefe
| 154703 ||  || — || May 13, 2004 || Palomar || NEAT || MAS || align=right data-sort-value="0.94" | 940 m || 
|-id=704 bgcolor=#E9E9E9
| 154704 ||  || — || May 13, 2004 || Palomar || NEAT || — || align=right | 1.6 km || 
|-id=705 bgcolor=#fefefe
| 154705 ||  || — || May 10, 2004 || Palomar || NEAT || NYS || align=right | 1.0 km || 
|-id=706 bgcolor=#fefefe
| 154706 ||  || — || May 14, 2004 || Kitt Peak || Spacewatch || — || align=right | 1.4 km || 
|-id=707 bgcolor=#fefefe
| 154707 ||  || — || May 15, 2004 || Socorro || LINEAR || V || align=right | 1.1 km || 
|-id=708 bgcolor=#fefefe
| 154708 ||  || — || May 15, 2004 || Socorro || LINEAR || — || align=right data-sort-value="0.90" | 900 m || 
|-id=709 bgcolor=#fefefe
| 154709 || 2004 KR || — || May 17, 2004 || Socorro || LINEAR || fast? || align=right | 1.5 km || 
|-id=710 bgcolor=#fefefe
| 154710 ||  || — || May 18, 2004 || Socorro || LINEAR || — || align=right | 1.4 km || 
|-id=711 bgcolor=#fefefe
| 154711 ||  || — || May 17, 2004 || Socorro || LINEAR || — || align=right | 1.1 km || 
|-id=712 bgcolor=#fefefe
| 154712 ||  || — || May 18, 2004 || Socorro || LINEAR || V || align=right | 1.0 km || 
|-id=713 bgcolor=#fefefe
| 154713 ||  || — || June 10, 2004 || Catalina || CSS || — || align=right | 2.8 km || 
|-id=714 bgcolor=#fefefe
| 154714 de Schepper ||  ||  || June 6, 2004 || Uccle || P. De Cat || — || align=right | 1.6 km || 
|-id=715 bgcolor=#FFC2E0
| 154715 ||  || — || June 13, 2004 || Socorro || LINEAR || APO || align=right data-sort-value="0.74" | 740 m || 
|-id=716 bgcolor=#fefefe
| 154716 ||  || — || June 13, 2004 || Palomar || NEAT || — || align=right | 1.6 km || 
|-id=717 bgcolor=#fefefe
| 154717 ||  || — || June 13, 2004 || Palomar || NEAT || V || align=right | 1.4 km || 
|-id=718 bgcolor=#fefefe
| 154718 ||  || — || June 15, 2004 || Siding Spring || SSS || PHO || align=right | 2.0 km || 
|-id=719 bgcolor=#fefefe
| 154719 ||  || — || June 22, 2004 || Reedy Creek || J. Broughton || — || align=right | 1.7 km || 
|-id=720 bgcolor=#fefefe
| 154720 ||  || — || June 27, 2004 || Reedy Creek || J. Broughton || — || align=right | 2.3 km || 
|-id=721 bgcolor=#fefefe
| 154721 ||  || — || June 16, 2004 || Anderson Mesa || LONEOS || ERI || align=right | 2.3 km || 
|-id=722 bgcolor=#fefefe
| 154722 || 2004 NA || — || July 6, 2004 || Campo Imperatore || CINEOS || NYS || align=right | 1.2 km || 
|-id=723 bgcolor=#fefefe
| 154723 || 2004 NS || — || July 7, 2004 || Campo Imperatore || CINEOS || ERI || align=right | 2.4 km || 
|-id=724 bgcolor=#E9E9E9
| 154724 || 2004 NU || — || July 7, 2004 || Campo Imperatore || CINEOS || — || align=right | 1.6 km || 
|-id=725 bgcolor=#E9E9E9
| 154725 ||  || — || July 9, 2004 || Siding Spring || SSS || — || align=right | 2.4 km || 
|-id=726 bgcolor=#fefefe
| 154726 ||  || — || July 10, 2004 || Catalina || CSS || — || align=right | 1.6 km || 
|-id=727 bgcolor=#fefefe
| 154727 ||  || — || July 12, 2004 || Reedy Creek || J. Broughton || — || align=right | 1.2 km || 
|-id=728 bgcolor=#fefefe
| 154728 ||  || — || July 9, 2004 || Socorro || LINEAR || NYS || align=right | 1.6 km || 
|-id=729 bgcolor=#fefefe
| 154729 ||  || — || July 9, 2004 || Socorro || LINEAR || — || align=right | 2.3 km || 
|-id=730 bgcolor=#fefefe
| 154730 ||  || — || July 9, 2004 || Socorro || LINEAR || — || align=right | 1.3 km || 
|-id=731 bgcolor=#E9E9E9
| 154731 ||  || — || July 9, 2004 || Socorro || LINEAR || — || align=right | 3.0 km || 
|-id=732 bgcolor=#E9E9E9
| 154732 ||  || — || July 11, 2004 || Socorro || LINEAR || — || align=right | 3.3 km || 
|-id=733 bgcolor=#fefefe
| 154733 ||  || — || July 11, 2004 || Socorro || LINEAR || NYS || align=right | 1.3 km || 
|-id=734 bgcolor=#fefefe
| 154734 ||  || — || July 11, 2004 || Socorro || LINEAR || CLA || align=right | 2.8 km || 
|-id=735 bgcolor=#fefefe
| 154735 ||  || — || July 11, 2004 || Socorro || LINEAR || — || align=right | 1.7 km || 
|-id=736 bgcolor=#E9E9E9
| 154736 ||  || — || July 11, 2004 || Socorro || LINEAR || — || align=right | 4.8 km || 
|-id=737 bgcolor=#E9E9E9
| 154737 ||  || — || July 11, 2004 || Socorro || LINEAR || EUN || align=right | 2.5 km || 
|-id=738 bgcolor=#fefefe
| 154738 ||  || — || July 14, 2004 || Socorro || LINEAR || V || align=right | 1.4 km || 
|-id=739 bgcolor=#fefefe
| 154739 ||  || — || July 15, 2004 || Socorro || LINEAR || — || align=right | 1.6 km || 
|-id=740 bgcolor=#E9E9E9
| 154740 ||  || — || July 14, 2004 || Socorro || LINEAR || — || align=right | 3.5 km || 
|-id=741 bgcolor=#fefefe
| 154741 ||  || — || July 11, 2004 || Socorro || LINEAR || — || align=right | 1.2 km || 
|-id=742 bgcolor=#fefefe
| 154742 ||  || — || July 9, 2004 || Anderson Mesa || LONEOS || MAS || align=right | 1.0 km || 
|-id=743 bgcolor=#E9E9E9
| 154743 ||  || — || July 16, 2004 || Socorro || LINEAR || — || align=right | 1.7 km || 
|-id=744 bgcolor=#E9E9E9
| 154744 ||  || — || July 16, 2004 || Socorro || LINEAR || — || align=right | 2.2 km || 
|-id=745 bgcolor=#fefefe
| 154745 ||  || — || July 16, 2004 || Socorro || LINEAR || — || align=right | 1.5 km || 
|-id=746 bgcolor=#fefefe
| 154746 ||  || — || July 16, 2004 || Socorro || LINEAR || — || align=right | 1.4 km || 
|-id=747 bgcolor=#fefefe
| 154747 ||  || — || July 19, 2004 || Reedy Creek || J. Broughton || NYS || align=right | 1.0 km || 
|-id=748 bgcolor=#E9E9E9
| 154748 ||  || — || July 20, 2004 || Reedy Creek || J. Broughton || PAD || align=right | 3.0 km || 
|-id=749 bgcolor=#fefefe
| 154749 ||  || — || August 3, 2004 || Siding Spring || SSS || NYS || align=right | 1.3 km || 
|-id=750 bgcolor=#fefefe
| 154750 ||  || — || August 3, 2004 || Siding Spring || SSS || — || align=right | 1.2 km || 
|-id=751 bgcolor=#d6d6d6
| 154751 ||  || — || August 3, 2004 || Siding Spring || SSS || URS || align=right | 5.4 km || 
|-id=752 bgcolor=#d6d6d6
| 154752 ||  || — || August 5, 2004 || Palomar || NEAT || — || align=right | 3.1 km || 
|-id=753 bgcolor=#fefefe
| 154753 ||  || — || August 6, 2004 || Palomar || NEAT || SUL || align=right | 3.9 km || 
|-id=754 bgcolor=#E9E9E9
| 154754 ||  || — || August 6, 2004 || Campo Imperatore || CINEOS || ADE || align=right | 4.3 km || 
|-id=755 bgcolor=#E9E9E9
| 154755 ||  || — || August 6, 2004 || Campo Imperatore || CINEOS || HOF || align=right | 4.3 km || 
|-id=756 bgcolor=#d6d6d6
| 154756 ||  || — || August 6, 2004 || Campo Imperatore || CINEOS || KOR || align=right | 2.4 km || 
|-id=757 bgcolor=#E9E9E9
| 154757 ||  || — || August 6, 2004 || Campo Imperatore || CINEOS || — || align=right | 3.0 km || 
|-id=758 bgcolor=#E9E9E9
| 154758 ||  || — || August 6, 2004 || Campo Imperatore || CINEOS || — || align=right | 1.3 km || 
|-id=759 bgcolor=#fefefe
| 154759 ||  || — || August 7, 2004 || Palomar || NEAT || NYS || align=right | 1.1 km || 
|-id=760 bgcolor=#fefefe
| 154760 ||  || — || August 7, 2004 || Palomar || NEAT || MAS || align=right | 1.3 km || 
|-id=761 bgcolor=#E9E9E9
| 154761 ||  || — || August 7, 2004 || Palomar || NEAT || EUN || align=right | 2.2 km || 
|-id=762 bgcolor=#fefefe
| 154762 ||  || — || August 7, 2004 || Palomar || NEAT || — || align=right | 1.8 km || 
|-id=763 bgcolor=#d6d6d6
| 154763 ||  || — || August 7, 2004 || Palomar || NEAT || — || align=right | 3.9 km || 
|-id=764 bgcolor=#fefefe
| 154764 ||  || — || August 7, 2004 || Palomar || NEAT || MAS || align=right | 1.4 km || 
|-id=765 bgcolor=#E9E9E9
| 154765 ||  || — || August 8, 2004 || Anderson Mesa || LONEOS || XIZ || align=right | 2.1 km || 
|-id=766 bgcolor=#E9E9E9
| 154766 ||  || — || August 8, 2004 || Anderson Mesa || LONEOS || — || align=right | 2.8 km || 
|-id=767 bgcolor=#E9E9E9
| 154767 ||  || — || August 8, 2004 || Socorro || LINEAR || AEO || align=right | 1.7 km || 
|-id=768 bgcolor=#d6d6d6
| 154768 ||  || — || August 8, 2004 || Socorro || LINEAR || EOS || align=right | 2.8 km || 
|-id=769 bgcolor=#fefefe
| 154769 ||  || — || August 8, 2004 || Socorro || LINEAR || MAS || align=right | 1.4 km || 
|-id=770 bgcolor=#d6d6d6
| 154770 ||  || — || August 8, 2004 || Socorro || LINEAR || — || align=right | 3.7 km || 
|-id=771 bgcolor=#fefefe
| 154771 ||  || — || August 8, 2004 || Socorro || LINEAR || NYS || align=right | 1.1 km || 
|-id=772 bgcolor=#E9E9E9
| 154772 ||  || — || August 8, 2004 || Socorro || LINEAR || HOF || align=right | 4.0 km || 
|-id=773 bgcolor=#fefefe
| 154773 ||  || — || August 8, 2004 || Socorro || LINEAR || MAS || align=right | 1.2 km || 
|-id=774 bgcolor=#E9E9E9
| 154774 ||  || — || August 6, 2004 || Palomar || NEAT || WIT || align=right | 1.5 km || 
|-id=775 bgcolor=#d6d6d6
| 154775 ||  || — || August 8, 2004 || Socorro || LINEAR || — || align=right | 3.9 km || 
|-id=776 bgcolor=#d6d6d6
| 154776 ||  || — || August 8, 2004 || Socorro || LINEAR || — || align=right | 4.1 km || 
|-id=777 bgcolor=#fefefe
| 154777 ||  || — || August 8, 2004 || Socorro || LINEAR || NYS || align=right | 1.5 km || 
|-id=778 bgcolor=#d6d6d6
| 154778 ||  || — || August 8, 2004 || Socorro || LINEAR || — || align=right | 5.7 km || 
|-id=779 bgcolor=#E9E9E9
| 154779 ||  || — || August 8, 2004 || Anderson Mesa || LONEOS || HEN || align=right | 1.6 km || 
|-id=780 bgcolor=#d6d6d6
| 154780 ||  || — || August 8, 2004 || Anderson Mesa || LONEOS || — || align=right | 3.9 km || 
|-id=781 bgcolor=#E9E9E9
| 154781 ||  || — || August 9, 2004 || Socorro || LINEAR || — || align=right | 2.1 km || 
|-id=782 bgcolor=#E9E9E9
| 154782 ||  || — || August 6, 2004 || Palomar || NEAT || AGN || align=right | 1.8 km || 
|-id=783 bgcolor=#C7FF8F
| 154783 ||  || — || August 7, 2004 || Palomar || NEAT || damocloidunusualcritical || align=right | 8.4 km || 
|-id=784 bgcolor=#fefefe
| 154784 ||  || — || August 7, 2004 || Palomar || NEAT || — || align=right | 1.2 km || 
|-id=785 bgcolor=#E9E9E9
| 154785 ||  || — || August 8, 2004 || Socorro || LINEAR || — || align=right | 2.2 km || 
|-id=786 bgcolor=#fefefe
| 154786 ||  || — || August 8, 2004 || Socorro || LINEAR || NYS || align=right | 1.3 km || 
|-id=787 bgcolor=#fefefe
| 154787 ||  || — || August 8, 2004 || Socorro || LINEAR || — || align=right | 1.6 km || 
|-id=788 bgcolor=#E9E9E9
| 154788 ||  || — || August 8, 2004 || Socorro || LINEAR || — || align=right | 1.6 km || 
|-id=789 bgcolor=#d6d6d6
| 154789 ||  || — || August 9, 2004 || Anderson Mesa || LONEOS || — || align=right | 3.5 km || 
|-id=790 bgcolor=#d6d6d6
| 154790 ||  || — || August 10, 2004 || Socorro || LINEAR || EOS || align=right | 2.8 km || 
|-id=791 bgcolor=#E9E9E9
| 154791 ||  || — || August 10, 2004 || Socorro || LINEAR || — || align=right | 2.8 km || 
|-id=792 bgcolor=#fefefe
| 154792 ||  || — || August 5, 2004 || Palomar || NEAT || FLO || align=right | 1.2 km || 
|-id=793 bgcolor=#d6d6d6
| 154793 ||  || — || August 6, 2004 || Campo Imperatore || CINEOS || — || align=right | 3.7 km || 
|-id=794 bgcolor=#d6d6d6
| 154794 ||  || — || August 7, 2004 || Palomar || NEAT || KOR || align=right | 2.3 km || 
|-id=795 bgcolor=#fefefe
| 154795 ||  || — || August 8, 2004 || Socorro || LINEAR || — || align=right | 1.7 km || 
|-id=796 bgcolor=#E9E9E9
| 154796 ||  || — || August 8, 2004 || Anderson Mesa || LONEOS || WIT || align=right | 1.4 km || 
|-id=797 bgcolor=#E9E9E9
| 154797 ||  || — || August 9, 2004 || Socorro || LINEAR || — || align=right | 4.0 km || 
|-id=798 bgcolor=#E9E9E9
| 154798 ||  || — || August 9, 2004 || Siding Spring || SSS || HNS || align=right | 2.1 km || 
|-id=799 bgcolor=#E9E9E9
| 154799 ||  || — || August 10, 2004 || Socorro || LINEAR || — || align=right | 1.3 km || 
|-id=800 bgcolor=#E9E9E9
| 154800 ||  || — || August 10, 2004 || Socorro || LINEAR || — || align=right | 1.5 km || 
|}

154801–154900 

|-bgcolor=#d6d6d6
| 154801 ||  || — || August 10, 2004 || Socorro || LINEAR || — || align=right | 3.9 km || 
|-id=802 bgcolor=#d6d6d6
| 154802 ||  || — || August 10, 2004 || Socorro || LINEAR || — || align=right | 4.2 km || 
|-id=803 bgcolor=#E9E9E9
| 154803 ||  || — || August 7, 2004 || Palomar || NEAT || INO || align=right | 1.6 km || 
|-id=804 bgcolor=#E9E9E9
| 154804 ||  || — || August 10, 2004 || Socorro || LINEAR || MAR || align=right | 2.2 km || 
|-id=805 bgcolor=#fefefe
| 154805 ||  || — || August 12, 2004 || Reedy Creek || J. Broughton || V || align=right | 1.1 km || 
|-id=806 bgcolor=#d6d6d6
| 154806 ||  || — || August 10, 2004 || Socorro || LINEAR || — || align=right | 5.7 km || 
|-id=807 bgcolor=#FFC2E0
| 154807 ||  || — || August 15, 2004 || Siding Spring || SSS || APOslowcritical || align=right data-sort-value="0.47" | 470 m || 
|-id=808 bgcolor=#E9E9E9
| 154808 ||  || — || August 12, 2004 || Siding Spring || SSS || — || align=right | 2.2 km || 
|-id=809 bgcolor=#E9E9E9
| 154809 ||  || — || August 15, 2004 || Siding Spring || SSS || — || align=right | 4.2 km || 
|-id=810 bgcolor=#d6d6d6
| 154810 ||  || — || August 15, 2004 || Campo Imperatore || CINEOS || — || align=right | 2.9 km || 
|-id=811 bgcolor=#E9E9E9
| 154811 ||  || — || August 11, 2004 || Socorro || LINEAR || — || align=right | 1.4 km || 
|-id=812 bgcolor=#d6d6d6
| 154812 ||  || — || August 10, 2004 || Socorro || LINEAR || — || align=right | 3.4 km || 
|-id=813 bgcolor=#fefefe
| 154813 || 2004 QA || — || August 16, 2004 || Pla D'Arguines || R. Ferrando || — || align=right | 1.3 km || 
|-id=814 bgcolor=#E9E9E9
| 154814 ||  || — || August 17, 2004 || Socorro || LINEAR || — || align=right | 2.5 km || 
|-id=815 bgcolor=#E9E9E9
| 154815 ||  || — || August 19, 2004 || Siding Spring || SSS || AGN || align=right | 2.3 km || 
|-id=816 bgcolor=#d6d6d6
| 154816 ||  || — || August 22, 2004 || Bergisch Gladbach || W. Bickel || KOR || align=right | 1.7 km || 
|-id=817 bgcolor=#d6d6d6
| 154817 ||  || — || August 19, 2004 || Siding Spring || SSS || ELF || align=right | 7.1 km || 
|-id=818 bgcolor=#d6d6d6
| 154818 ||  || — || August 19, 2004 || Siding Spring || SSS || HYG || align=right | 4.7 km || 
|-id=819 bgcolor=#fefefe
| 154819 ||  || — || August 21, 2004 || Siding Spring || SSS || — || align=right | 1.8 km || 
|-id=820 bgcolor=#d6d6d6
| 154820 ||  || — || August 21, 2004 || Siding Spring || SSS || — || align=right | 5.2 km || 
|-id=821 bgcolor=#fefefe
| 154821 ||  || — || August 21, 2004 || Siding Spring || SSS || — || align=right | 1.4 km || 
|-id=822 bgcolor=#d6d6d6
| 154822 ||  || — || August 21, 2004 || Kitt Peak || Spacewatch || KOR || align=right | 2.5 km || 
|-id=823 bgcolor=#d6d6d6
| 154823 ||  || — || August 26, 2004 || Catalina || CSS || EUP || align=right | 7.2 km || 
|-id=824 bgcolor=#d6d6d6
| 154824 ||  || — || September 4, 2004 || Palomar || NEAT || — || align=right | 6.1 km || 
|-id=825 bgcolor=#E9E9E9
| 154825 ||  || — || September 5, 2004 || Palomar || NEAT || — || align=right | 3.5 km || 
|-id=826 bgcolor=#fefefe
| 154826 ||  || — || September 5, 2004 || Palomar || NEAT || — || align=right | 1.6 km || 
|-id=827 bgcolor=#d6d6d6
| 154827 ||  || — || September 6, 2004 || Palomar || NEAT || Tj (2.96) || align=right | 9.4 km || 
|-id=828 bgcolor=#E9E9E9
| 154828 ||  || — || September 6, 2004 || Goodricke-Pigott || R. A. Tucker || EUN || align=right | 2.2 km || 
|-id=829 bgcolor=#E9E9E9
| 154829 ||  || — || September 6, 2004 || Goodricke-Pigott || R. A. Tucker || AGN || align=right | 2.3 km || 
|-id=830 bgcolor=#E9E9E9
| 154830 ||  || — || September 3, 2004 || Anderson Mesa || LONEOS || — || align=right | 4.3 km || 
|-id=831 bgcolor=#E9E9E9
| 154831 ||  || — || September 6, 2004 || Siding Spring || SSS || — || align=right | 3.5 km || 
|-id=832 bgcolor=#d6d6d6
| 154832 ||  || — || September 7, 2004 || Kitt Peak || Spacewatch || HYG || align=right | 4.5 km || 
|-id=833 bgcolor=#d6d6d6
| 154833 ||  || — || September 7, 2004 || Socorro || LINEAR || KAR || align=right | 1.9 km || 
|-id=834 bgcolor=#E9E9E9
| 154834 ||  || — || September 4, 2004 || Palomar || NEAT || — || align=right | 1.5 km || 
|-id=835 bgcolor=#d6d6d6
| 154835 ||  || — || September 6, 2004 || Siding Spring || SSS || — || align=right | 5.9 km || 
|-id=836 bgcolor=#E9E9E9
| 154836 ||  || — || September 7, 2004 || Socorro || LINEAR || — || align=right | 3.1 km || 
|-id=837 bgcolor=#fefefe
| 154837 ||  || — || September 7, 2004 || Socorro || LINEAR || — || align=right | 1.7 km || 
|-id=838 bgcolor=#d6d6d6
| 154838 ||  || — || September 7, 2004 || Socorro || LINEAR || — || align=right | 3.2 km || 
|-id=839 bgcolor=#d6d6d6
| 154839 ||  || — || September 7, 2004 || Socorro || LINEAR || — || align=right | 4.6 km || 
|-id=840 bgcolor=#E9E9E9
| 154840 ||  || — || September 7, 2004 || Socorro || LINEAR || NEM || align=right | 4.0 km || 
|-id=841 bgcolor=#d6d6d6
| 154841 ||  || — || September 7, 2004 || Socorro || LINEAR || — || align=right | 4.8 km || 
|-id=842 bgcolor=#d6d6d6
| 154842 ||  || — || September 7, 2004 || Kitt Peak || Spacewatch || — || align=right | 3.6 km || 
|-id=843 bgcolor=#d6d6d6
| 154843 ||  || — || September 8, 2004 || Socorro || LINEAR || URS || align=right | 3.2 km || 
|-id=844 bgcolor=#d6d6d6
| 154844 ||  || — || September 8, 2004 || Socorro || LINEAR || — || align=right | 5.5 km || 
|-id=845 bgcolor=#E9E9E9
| 154845 ||  || — || September 8, 2004 || Socorro || LINEAR || — || align=right | 2.0 km || 
|-id=846 bgcolor=#d6d6d6
| 154846 ||  || — || September 8, 2004 || Socorro || LINEAR || THM || align=right | 3.5 km || 
|-id=847 bgcolor=#E9E9E9
| 154847 ||  || — || September 8, 2004 || Socorro || LINEAR || PAD || align=right | 3.5 km || 
|-id=848 bgcolor=#d6d6d6
| 154848 ||  || — || September 8, 2004 || Socorro || LINEAR || KOR || align=right | 2.5 km || 
|-id=849 bgcolor=#fefefe
| 154849 ||  || — || September 8, 2004 || Socorro || LINEAR || NYS || align=right | 1.4 km || 
|-id=850 bgcolor=#d6d6d6
| 154850 ||  || — || September 8, 2004 || Socorro || LINEAR || — || align=right | 4.8 km || 
|-id=851 bgcolor=#E9E9E9
| 154851 ||  || — || September 8, 2004 || Socorro || LINEAR || — || align=right | 3.7 km || 
|-id=852 bgcolor=#d6d6d6
| 154852 ||  || — || September 8, 2004 || Socorro || LINEAR || — || align=right | 5.9 km || 
|-id=853 bgcolor=#E9E9E9
| 154853 ||  || — || September 8, 2004 || Socorro || LINEAR || — || align=right | 4.1 km || 
|-id=854 bgcolor=#d6d6d6
| 154854 ||  || — || September 8, 2004 || Socorro || LINEAR || — || align=right | 6.7 km || 
|-id=855 bgcolor=#d6d6d6
| 154855 ||  || — || September 8, 2004 || Socorro || LINEAR || — || align=right | 3.6 km || 
|-id=856 bgcolor=#fefefe
| 154856 ||  || — || September 8, 2004 || Socorro || LINEAR || NYS || align=right | 1.2 km || 
|-id=857 bgcolor=#E9E9E9
| 154857 ||  || — || September 8, 2004 || Socorro || LINEAR || HNA || align=right | 4.7 km || 
|-id=858 bgcolor=#E9E9E9
| 154858 ||  || — || September 8, 2004 || Socorro || LINEAR || — || align=right | 3.5 km || 
|-id=859 bgcolor=#d6d6d6
| 154859 ||  || — || September 8, 2004 || Socorro || LINEAR || K-2 || align=right | 2.2 km || 
|-id=860 bgcolor=#d6d6d6
| 154860 ||  || — || September 8, 2004 || Socorro || LINEAR || — || align=right | 5.4 km || 
|-id=861 bgcolor=#d6d6d6
| 154861 ||  || — || September 9, 2004 || Socorro || LINEAR || K-2 || align=right | 2.0 km || 
|-id=862 bgcolor=#fefefe
| 154862 ||  || — || September 9, 2004 || Socorro || LINEAR || MAS || align=right | 1.1 km || 
|-id=863 bgcolor=#d6d6d6
| 154863 ||  || — || September 9, 2004 || Socorro || LINEAR || — || align=right | 5.6 km || 
|-id=864 bgcolor=#d6d6d6
| 154864 ||  || — || September 9, 2004 || Socorro || LINEAR || KOR || align=right | 2.3 km || 
|-id=865 bgcolor=#d6d6d6
| 154865 Stefanheutz ||  ||  || September 9, 2004 || Altschwendt || W. Ries || BRA || align=right | 3.5 km || 
|-id=866 bgcolor=#E9E9E9
| 154866 ||  || — || September 8, 2004 || Socorro || LINEAR || HOF || align=right | 4.1 km || 
|-id=867 bgcolor=#fefefe
| 154867 ||  || — || September 8, 2004 || Socorro || LINEAR || — || align=right | 1.7 km || 
|-id=868 bgcolor=#E9E9E9
| 154868 ||  || — || September 8, 2004 || Socorro || LINEAR || NEM || align=right | 2.9 km || 
|-id=869 bgcolor=#d6d6d6
| 154869 ||  || — || September 8, 2004 || Socorro || LINEAR || HYG || align=right | 3.7 km || 
|-id=870 bgcolor=#d6d6d6
| 154870 ||  || — || September 8, 2004 || Palomar || NEAT || — || align=right | 7.5 km || 
|-id=871 bgcolor=#d6d6d6
| 154871 ||  || — || September 8, 2004 || Palomar || NEAT || — || align=right | 5.7 km || 
|-id=872 bgcolor=#E9E9E9
| 154872 ||  || — || September 8, 2004 || Palomar || NEAT || — || align=right | 2.9 km || 
|-id=873 bgcolor=#d6d6d6
| 154873 ||  || — || September 8, 2004 || Palomar || NEAT || EOS || align=right | 3.8 km || 
|-id=874 bgcolor=#E9E9E9
| 154874 ||  || — || September 9, 2004 || Kitt Peak || Spacewatch || — || align=right | 4.4 km || 
|-id=875 bgcolor=#E9E9E9
| 154875 ||  || — || September 7, 2004 || Socorro || LINEAR || — || align=right | 4.0 km || 
|-id=876 bgcolor=#d6d6d6
| 154876 ||  || — || September 7, 2004 || Kitt Peak || Spacewatch || KOR || align=right | 1.8 km || 
|-id=877 bgcolor=#E9E9E9
| 154877 ||  || — || September 7, 2004 || Socorro || LINEAR || — || align=right | 4.6 km || 
|-id=878 bgcolor=#d6d6d6
| 154878 ||  || — || September 7, 2004 || Kitt Peak || Spacewatch || THM || align=right | 3.8 km || 
|-id=879 bgcolor=#E9E9E9
| 154879 ||  || — || September 8, 2004 || Socorro || LINEAR || AGN || align=right | 2.1 km || 
|-id=880 bgcolor=#E9E9E9
| 154880 ||  || — || September 8, 2004 || Socorro || LINEAR || — || align=right | 4.4 km || 
|-id=881 bgcolor=#d6d6d6
| 154881 ||  || — || September 8, 2004 || Socorro || LINEAR || — || align=right | 5.4 km || 
|-id=882 bgcolor=#d6d6d6
| 154882 ||  || — || September 9, 2004 || Socorro || LINEAR || HYG || align=right | 5.1 km || 
|-id=883 bgcolor=#d6d6d6
| 154883 ||  || — || September 9, 2004 || Socorro || LINEAR || TEL || align=right | 2.3 km || 
|-id=884 bgcolor=#E9E9E9
| 154884 ||  || — || September 9, 2004 || Socorro || LINEAR || — || align=right | 4.6 km || 
|-id=885 bgcolor=#d6d6d6
| 154885 ||  || — || September 9, 2004 || Socorro || LINEAR || — || align=right | 4.2 km || 
|-id=886 bgcolor=#E9E9E9
| 154886 ||  || — || September 10, 2004 || Socorro || LINEAR || GEF || align=right | 2.2 km || 
|-id=887 bgcolor=#d6d6d6
| 154887 ||  || — || September 11, 2004 || Siding Spring || SSS || — || align=right | 6.4 km || 
|-id=888 bgcolor=#d6d6d6
| 154888 ||  || — || September 9, 2004 || Uccle || P. De Cat, E. W. Elst || TEL || align=right | 2.5 km || 
|-id=889 bgcolor=#d6d6d6
| 154889 ||  || — || September 6, 2004 || Siding Spring || SSS || — || align=right | 4.1 km || 
|-id=890 bgcolor=#d6d6d6
| 154890 ||  || — || September 10, 2004 || Socorro || LINEAR || — || align=right | 4.7 km || 
|-id=891 bgcolor=#d6d6d6
| 154891 ||  || — || September 10, 2004 || Socorro || LINEAR || — || align=right | 5.2 km || 
|-id=892 bgcolor=#E9E9E9
| 154892 ||  || — || September 10, 2004 || Socorro || LINEAR || ADE || align=right | 4.9 km || 
|-id=893 bgcolor=#d6d6d6
| 154893 ||  || — || September 10, 2004 || Socorro || LINEAR || — || align=right | 5.6 km || 
|-id=894 bgcolor=#d6d6d6
| 154894 ||  || — || September 11, 2004 || Socorro || LINEAR || — || align=right | 6.5 km || 
|-id=895 bgcolor=#d6d6d6
| 154895 ||  || — || September 7, 2004 || Kitt Peak || Spacewatch || — || align=right | 4.5 km || 
|-id=896 bgcolor=#d6d6d6
| 154896 ||  || — || September 9, 2004 || Kitt Peak || Spacewatch || — || align=right | 4.3 km || 
|-id=897 bgcolor=#d6d6d6
| 154897 ||  || — || September 9, 2004 || Kitt Peak || Spacewatch || — || align=right | 4.3 km || 
|-id=898 bgcolor=#d6d6d6
| 154898 ||  || — || September 9, 2004 || Kitt Peak || Spacewatch || EOS || align=right | 3.0 km || 
|-id=899 bgcolor=#d6d6d6
| 154899 ||  || — || September 10, 2004 || Kitt Peak || Spacewatch || — || align=right | 3.7 km || 
|-id=900 bgcolor=#d6d6d6
| 154900 ||  || — || September 10, 2004 || Kitt Peak || Spacewatch || THM || align=right | 3.5 km || 
|}

154901–155000 

|-bgcolor=#d6d6d6
| 154901 ||  || — || September 10, 2004 || Kitt Peak || Spacewatch || EOS || align=right | 3.3 km || 
|-id=902 bgcolor=#d6d6d6
| 154902 Davidtoth ||  ||  || September 12, 2004 || Jarnac || Jarnac Obs. || — || align=right | 5.5 km || 
|-id=903 bgcolor=#fefefe
| 154903 ||  || — || September 13, 2004 || Socorro || LINEAR || — || align=right | 1.7 km || 
|-id=904 bgcolor=#d6d6d6
| 154904 ||  || — || September 12, 2004 || Socorro || LINEAR || 7:4 || align=right | 4.7 km || 
|-id=905 bgcolor=#d6d6d6
| 154905 ||  || — || September 12, 2004 || Socorro || LINEAR || — || align=right | 4.6 km || 
|-id=906 bgcolor=#d6d6d6
| 154906 ||  || — || September 12, 2004 || Socorro || LINEAR || 7:4 || align=right | 4.7 km || 
|-id=907 bgcolor=#d6d6d6
| 154907 ||  || — || September 15, 2004 || Bergisch Gladbach || W. Bickel || — || align=right | 2.6 km || 
|-id=908 bgcolor=#d6d6d6
| 154908 ||  || — || September 13, 2004 || Socorro || LINEAR || EOS || align=right | 4.0 km || 
|-id=909 bgcolor=#E9E9E9
| 154909 ||  || — || September 13, 2004 || Palomar || NEAT || — || align=right | 3.4 km || 
|-id=910 bgcolor=#d6d6d6
| 154910 ||  || — || September 15, 2004 || Kitt Peak || Spacewatch || — || align=right | 5.8 km || 
|-id=911 bgcolor=#d6d6d6
| 154911 ||  || — || September 15, 2004 || Socorro || LINEAR || EOS || align=right | 3.8 km || 
|-id=912 bgcolor=#E9E9E9
| 154912 ||  || — || September 17, 2004 || Socorro || LINEAR || — || align=right | 3.9 km || 
|-id=913 bgcolor=#d6d6d6
| 154913 ||  || — || September 17, 2004 || Kitt Peak || Spacewatch || — || align=right | 3.4 km || 
|-id=914 bgcolor=#d6d6d6
| 154914 ||  || — || September 17, 2004 || Socorro || LINEAR || — || align=right | 4.0 km || 
|-id=915 bgcolor=#d6d6d6
| 154915 ||  || — || September 17, 2004 || Socorro || LINEAR || 7:4 || align=right | 9.8 km || 
|-id=916 bgcolor=#E9E9E9
| 154916 ||  || — || September 16, 2004 || Kitt Peak || Spacewatch || — || align=right | 2.5 km || 
|-id=917 bgcolor=#E9E9E9
| 154917 ||  || — || September 17, 2004 || Socorro || LINEAR || MRX || align=right | 2.0 km || 
|-id=918 bgcolor=#d6d6d6
| 154918 ||  || — || September 17, 2004 || Kitt Peak || Spacewatch || — || align=right | 4.0 km || 
|-id=919 bgcolor=#d6d6d6
| 154919 ||  || — || September 17, 2004 || Socorro || LINEAR || HYG || align=right | 4.7 km || 
|-id=920 bgcolor=#E9E9E9
| 154920 ||  || — || September 17, 2004 || Socorro || LINEAR || — || align=right | 4.6 km || 
|-id=921 bgcolor=#E9E9E9
| 154921 ||  || — || September 17, 2004 || Socorro || LINEAR || — || align=right | 3.1 km || 
|-id=922 bgcolor=#d6d6d6
| 154922 ||  || — || September 17, 2004 || Socorro || LINEAR || — || align=right | 4.2 km || 
|-id=923 bgcolor=#d6d6d6
| 154923 ||  || — || September 17, 2004 || Socorro || LINEAR || — || align=right | 4.1 km || 
|-id=924 bgcolor=#E9E9E9
| 154924 ||  || — || September 17, 2004 || Socorro || LINEAR || HEN || align=right | 1.7 km || 
|-id=925 bgcolor=#d6d6d6
| 154925 ||  || — || September 17, 2004 || Kitt Peak || Spacewatch || KOR || align=right | 2.5 km || 
|-id=926 bgcolor=#d6d6d6
| 154926 ||  || — || September 18, 2004 || Socorro || LINEAR || — || align=right | 5.7 km || 
|-id=927 bgcolor=#d6d6d6
| 154927 ||  || — || September 22, 2004 || Socorro || LINEAR || — || align=right | 8.6 km || 
|-id=928 bgcolor=#d6d6d6
| 154928 ||  || — || September 16, 2004 || Anderson Mesa || LONEOS || — || align=right | 4.3 km || 
|-id=929 bgcolor=#d6d6d6
| 154929 ||  || — || September 17, 2004 || Anderson Mesa || LONEOS || — || align=right | 4.9 km || 
|-id=930 bgcolor=#E9E9E9
| 154930 ||  || — || October 4, 2004 || Goodricke-Pigott || R. A. Tucker || NEM || align=right | 4.6 km || 
|-id=931 bgcolor=#d6d6d6
| 154931 ||  || — || October 2, 2004 || Needville || Needville Obs. || — || align=right | 4.1 km || 
|-id=932 bgcolor=#d6d6d6
| 154932 Sviderskiene ||  ||  || October 12, 2004 || Moletai || K. Černis, J. Zdanavičius || SHU3:2 || align=right | 7.3 km || 
|-id=933 bgcolor=#d6d6d6
| 154933 ||  || — || October 4, 2004 || Kitt Peak || Spacewatch || — || align=right | 5.4 km || 
|-id=934 bgcolor=#E9E9E9
| 154934 ||  || — || October 4, 2004 || Kitt Peak || Spacewatch || MRX || align=right | 2.0 km || 
|-id=935 bgcolor=#E9E9E9
| 154935 ||  || — || October 4, 2004 || Anderson Mesa || LONEOS || XIZ || align=right | 2.2 km || 
|-id=936 bgcolor=#d6d6d6
| 154936 ||  || — || October 4, 2004 || Kitt Peak || Spacewatch || — || align=right | 3.0 km || 
|-id=937 bgcolor=#d6d6d6
| 154937 ||  || — || October 4, 2004 || Kitt Peak || Spacewatch || EOS || align=right | 3.8 km || 
|-id=938 bgcolor=#d6d6d6
| 154938 Besserman ||  ||  || October 4, 2004 || Jarnac || Jarnac Obs. || THM || align=right | 2.8 km || 
|-id=939 bgcolor=#E9E9E9
| 154939 ||  || — || October 4, 2004 || Kitt Peak || Spacewatch || — || align=right | 2.9 km || 
|-id=940 bgcolor=#d6d6d6
| 154940 ||  || — || October 4, 2004 || Kitt Peak || Spacewatch || — || align=right | 4.1 km || 
|-id=941 bgcolor=#d6d6d6
| 154941 ||  || — || October 4, 2004 || Kitt Peak || Spacewatch || THM || align=right | 5.4 km || 
|-id=942 bgcolor=#E9E9E9
| 154942 ||  || — || October 5, 2004 || Kitt Peak || Spacewatch || — || align=right | 1.2 km || 
|-id=943 bgcolor=#d6d6d6
| 154943 ||  || — || October 5, 2004 || Anderson Mesa || LONEOS || 7:4* || align=right | 7.2 km || 
|-id=944 bgcolor=#E9E9E9
| 154944 ||  || — || October 5, 2004 || Anderson Mesa || LONEOS || — || align=right | 2.4 km || 
|-id=945 bgcolor=#d6d6d6
| 154945 ||  || — || October 5, 2004 || Kitt Peak || Spacewatch || KOR || align=right | 2.2 km || 
|-id=946 bgcolor=#d6d6d6
| 154946 ||  || — || October 5, 2004 || Palomar || NEAT || — || align=right | 7.8 km || 
|-id=947 bgcolor=#d6d6d6
| 154947 ||  || — || October 5, 2004 || Anderson Mesa || LONEOS || — || align=right | 3.3 km || 
|-id=948 bgcolor=#d6d6d6
| 154948 ||  || — || October 7, 2004 || Anderson Mesa || LONEOS || — || align=right | 3.9 km || 
|-id=949 bgcolor=#d6d6d6
| 154949 ||  || — || October 4, 2004 || Anderson Mesa || LONEOS || — || align=right | 5.3 km || 
|-id=950 bgcolor=#d6d6d6
| 154950 ||  || — || October 5, 2004 || Kitt Peak || Spacewatch || — || align=right | 3.1 km || 
|-id=951 bgcolor=#E9E9E9
| 154951 ||  || — || October 5, 2004 || Kitt Peak || Spacewatch || — || align=right | 1.5 km || 
|-id=952 bgcolor=#d6d6d6
| 154952 ||  || — || October 5, 2004 || Kitt Peak || Spacewatch || — || align=right | 3.2 km || 
|-id=953 bgcolor=#E9E9E9
| 154953 ||  || — || October 7, 2004 || Socorro || LINEAR || MRX || align=right | 1.9 km || 
|-id=954 bgcolor=#d6d6d6
| 154954 ||  || — || October 5, 2004 || Palomar || NEAT || URS || align=right | 5.8 km || 
|-id=955 bgcolor=#d6d6d6
| 154955 ||  || — || October 6, 2004 || Palomar || NEAT || HYG || align=right | 5.7 km || 
|-id=956 bgcolor=#fefefe
| 154956 ||  || — || October 7, 2004 || Socorro || LINEAR || NYS || align=right | 1.1 km || 
|-id=957 bgcolor=#d6d6d6
| 154957 ||  || — || October 7, 2004 || Socorro || LINEAR || — || align=right | 3.9 km || 
|-id=958 bgcolor=#d6d6d6
| 154958 ||  || — || October 8, 2004 || Anderson Mesa || LONEOS || — || align=right | 6.8 km || 
|-id=959 bgcolor=#d6d6d6
| 154959 ||  || — || October 8, 2004 || Anderson Mesa || LONEOS || THM || align=right | 3.8 km || 
|-id=960 bgcolor=#d6d6d6
| 154960 ||  || — || October 7, 2004 || Kitt Peak || Spacewatch || SHU3:2 || align=right | 9.2 km || 
|-id=961 bgcolor=#d6d6d6
| 154961 ||  || — || October 9, 2004 || Kitt Peak || Spacewatch || — || align=right | 4.7 km || 
|-id=962 bgcolor=#d6d6d6
| 154962 ||  || — || October 3, 2004 || Palomar || NEAT || KOR || align=right | 2.1 km || 
|-id=963 bgcolor=#d6d6d6
| 154963 ||  || — || October 5, 2004 || Socorro || LINEAR || — || align=right | 5.7 km || 
|-id=964 bgcolor=#d6d6d6
| 154964 ||  || — || October 8, 2004 || Kitt Peak || Spacewatch || EOS || align=right | 3.5 km || 
|-id=965 bgcolor=#d6d6d6
| 154965 ||  || — || October 9, 2004 || Kitt Peak || Spacewatch || HYG || align=right | 4.7 km || 
|-id=966 bgcolor=#d6d6d6
| 154966 ||  || — || October 9, 2004 || Kitt Peak || Spacewatch || SYL7:4 || align=right | 7.7 km || 
|-id=967 bgcolor=#d6d6d6
| 154967 ||  || — || October 9, 2004 || Palomar || NEAT || ALA || align=right | 7.2 km || 
|-id=968 bgcolor=#d6d6d6
| 154968 ||  || — || October 9, 2004 || Kitt Peak || Spacewatch || — || align=right | 5.1 km || 
|-id=969 bgcolor=#d6d6d6
| 154969 ||  || — || October 9, 2004 || Kitt Peak || Spacewatch || — || align=right | 6.1 km || 
|-id=970 bgcolor=#d6d6d6
| 154970 ||  || — || October 10, 2004 || Kitt Peak || Spacewatch || — || align=right | 3.3 km || 
|-id=971 bgcolor=#d6d6d6
| 154971 ||  || — || October 7, 2004 || Socorro || LINEAR || 3:2 || align=right | 7.0 km || 
|-id=972 bgcolor=#d6d6d6
| 154972 ||  || — || October 14, 2004 || Kitt Peak || Spacewatch || — || align=right | 4.4 km || 
|-id=973 bgcolor=#d6d6d6
| 154973 ||  || — || October 15, 2004 || Kitt Peak || Spacewatch || — || align=right | 5.6 km || 
|-id=974 bgcolor=#d6d6d6
| 154974 ||  || — || October 15, 2004 || Kitt Peak || Spacewatch || HYG || align=right | 5.6 km || 
|-id=975 bgcolor=#d6d6d6
| 154975 ||  || — || October 9, 2004 || Kitt Peak || Spacewatch || — || align=right | 4.7 km || 
|-id=976 bgcolor=#d6d6d6
| 154976 ||  || — || October 19, 2004 || Hormersdorf || Hormersdorf Obs. || — || align=right | 6.3 km || 
|-id=977 bgcolor=#d6d6d6
| 154977 ||  || — || October 20, 2004 || Socorro || LINEAR || EOS || align=right | 3.2 km || 
|-id=978 bgcolor=#E9E9E9
| 154978 ||  || — || October 19, 2004 || Socorro || LINEAR || — || align=right | 2.9 km || 
|-id=979 bgcolor=#E9E9E9
| 154979 ||  || — || October 20, 2004 || Socorro || LINEAR || NEM || align=right | 4.3 km || 
|-id=980 bgcolor=#d6d6d6
| 154980 ||  || — || October 21, 2004 || Socorro || LINEAR || EOS || align=right | 3.7 km || 
|-id=981 bgcolor=#d6d6d6
| 154981 ||  || — || November 3, 2004 || Kitt Peak || Spacewatch || — || align=right | 6.0 km || 
|-id=982 bgcolor=#d6d6d6
| 154982 ||  || — || November 5, 2004 || Campo Imperatore || CINEOS || — || align=right | 3.9 km || 
|-id=983 bgcolor=#d6d6d6
| 154983 ||  || — || November 3, 2004 || Kitt Peak || Spacewatch || EOS || align=right | 3.6 km || 
|-id=984 bgcolor=#d6d6d6
| 154984 ||  || — || November 4, 2004 || Kitt Peak || Spacewatch || — || align=right | 4.2 km || 
|-id=985 bgcolor=#d6d6d6
| 154985 ||  || — || November 4, 2004 || Catalina || CSS || — || align=right | 5.1 km || 
|-id=986 bgcolor=#E9E9E9
| 154986 ||  || — || November 4, 2004 || Catalina || CSS || MIS || align=right | 4.1 km || 
|-id=987 bgcolor=#d6d6d6
| 154987 ||  || — || November 17, 2004 || Campo Imperatore || CINEOS || — || align=right | 4.7 km || 
|-id=988 bgcolor=#FFC2E0
| 154988 ||  || — || December 12, 2004 || Catalina || CSS || APO || align=right data-sort-value="0.74" | 740 m || 
|-id=989 bgcolor=#C2FFFF
| 154989 ||  || — || January 6, 2005 || Catalina || CSS || L5 || align=right | 15 km || 
|-id=990 bgcolor=#C2FFFF
| 154990 ||  || — || January 13, 2005 || Kitt Peak || Spacewatch || L5 || align=right | 13 km || 
|-id=991 bgcolor=#FFC2E0
| 154991 Vinciguerra ||  ||  || January 17, 2005 || La Silla || A. Boattini, H. Scholl || AMO || align=right data-sort-value="0.71" | 710 m || 
|-id=992 bgcolor=#C2FFFF
| 154992 ||  || — || February 4, 2005 || Anderson Mesa || LONEOS || L5 || align=right | 18 km || 
|-id=993 bgcolor=#FFC2E0
| 154993 ||  || — || March 8, 2005 || Socorro || LINEAR || APO +1km || align=right data-sort-value="0.83" | 830 m || 
|-id=994 bgcolor=#E9E9E9
| 154994 ||  || — || March 10, 2005 || Catalina || CSS || Tj (2.95) || align=right | 4.0 km || 
|-id=995 bgcolor=#fefefe
| 154995 ||  || — || June 30, 2005 || Palomar || NEAT || NYS || align=right | 1.0 km || 
|-id=996 bgcolor=#fefefe
| 154996 ||  || — || June 29, 2005 || Palomar || NEAT || — || align=right data-sort-value="0.87" | 870 m || 
|-id=997 bgcolor=#fefefe
| 154997 ||  || — || July 2, 2005 || Kambah || D. Herald || H || align=right | 1.5 km || 
|-id=998 bgcolor=#fefefe
| 154998 ||  || — || July 1, 2005 || Catalina || CSS || NYS || align=right | 1.1 km || 
|-id=999 bgcolor=#fefefe
| 154999 ||  || — || July 5, 2005 || Palomar || NEAT || FLO || align=right | 1.1 km || 
|-id=000 bgcolor=#E9E9E9
| 155000 ||  || — || July 7, 2005 || Socorro || LINEAR || — || align=right | 3.2 km || 
|}

References

External links 
 Discovery Circumstances: Numbered Minor Planets (150001)–(155000) (IAU Minor Planet Center)

0154